= Tomáš Cihlář =

Czech biochemist and virologist

- Born: 1967 (age 58–59); Plzeň, Czechoslovakia
- Education: University of Chemistry and Technology, Prague
- Occupations: Biochemist, virologist
- Known for: Remdesivir, tenofovir disoproxil

Tomáš Cihlář (born 1967) is a Czech biochemist known for his role in the development of remdesivir. A specialist in virology, Cihlář holds the positions of senior director, biology, and vice-president at American pharmaceutical company Gilead Sciences. As a student, Cihlář assisted fellow biochemist Antonín Holý in developing Viread, the primary drug used to fight HIV infection.

== Early life and education ==
Cihlář was born in 1967 in Plzeň, Czechoslovakia (now the Czech Republic). He graduated from the University of Chemistry and Technology, Prague, majoring in fermentation chemistry and bioengineering under the tutelage of Jan Páca and Vladimír Jirků. He completed his postgraduate studies at the Institute of Organic Chemistry and Biochemistry of the ASCR under Ivan Rosenberg and Ivan Votruba. In 1994 he obtained the title of Candidate of Sciences and was engaged in the research of antiviral agents under the tutelage of Antonín Holý.

That same year, he traveled to the United States for a postdoctoral fellowship with Gilead Sciences, where as researcher he worked on the development of antiviral nucleotide analogs including tenofovir disoproxil fumarate, which, marketed as Viread, has become a primary drug in the fight against HIV infection.

== Career ==
At Gilead, leading a team of hundreds of scientists working on new substances for the treatment of HIV, viral hepatitis B, respiratory infections and other viral diseases such as Ebola, MERS, and dengue fever, Cihlář is as of 2020 responsible for biological research on HIV and respiratory viruses. On a number of these projects, he continues to work closely with scientists from the Institute of Organic Chemistry and Biochemistry, particularly Zdeněk Havlas and Zdeněk Hostomský, and with the Radim Nencka Group, which develops compounds capable of stopping the replication of important human pathogens by blocking the remodeling of cell membranes induced by these viruses.

Cihlář is engaged in ongoing research into HIV inhibitors that target the enzyme integrase and prevent the formation of viral capsids. Recently, these entail low molecular weight agonists of TLR7 (toll-like receptor 7). TLR7 receptors recognize single-stranded RNA in endosomes and play a role in innate antiviral immunity. Such substances should help eliminate the HIV reservoir in T-lymphocytes and completely cure HIV patients.

In 2006, Cihlář received a William Prusoff Young Investigator Lecture Award from the International Society for Antiviral Research for his work on antiviral nucleotide analogs. He has patented dozens of novel inventions. In 2025 he was awarded the Warren Alpert Foundation Prize.

=== Remdesivir ===
Also at Gilead, Cihlář is one of the company's lead researchers in the development of remdesivir, originally intended for treatment of Ebola. However, the Ebola epidemic ended before the new drug could be tested. Remdesivir briefly showed considerable promise in treating COVID-19 infection; in April 2020 the company provided 5,000 doses for experimental use in China and four hundred patients in 50 other countries. Remdesivir was used to treat the first confirmed case of coronavirus in the U.S. (Note: On 21 January 2020, the Wuhan Institute of Virology applied for a Chinese "use patent", for treatment of Covid-19.) In early June 2020 it was reported that AstraZeneca, a British-Swedish multinational pharmaceutical and biopharmaceutical company headquartered in Cambridge, England, was pursuing a merger with Gilead due to a shared interest in the potential of remdesivir. However, in September 2020, the WHO’s guidelines committee issued a statement that there was no evidence of benefit. In October 2020, recognizing his involvement in the development of remdesivir, Czech president Miloš Zeman awarded Cihlář the country's Silver Medal of Merit.

In April 2021 Cihlář discussed the possibility of marketing remdesivir in pill form.
