= Emtricitabine/tenofovir =

Drug combination for HIV/AIDS prophylaxis and treatment

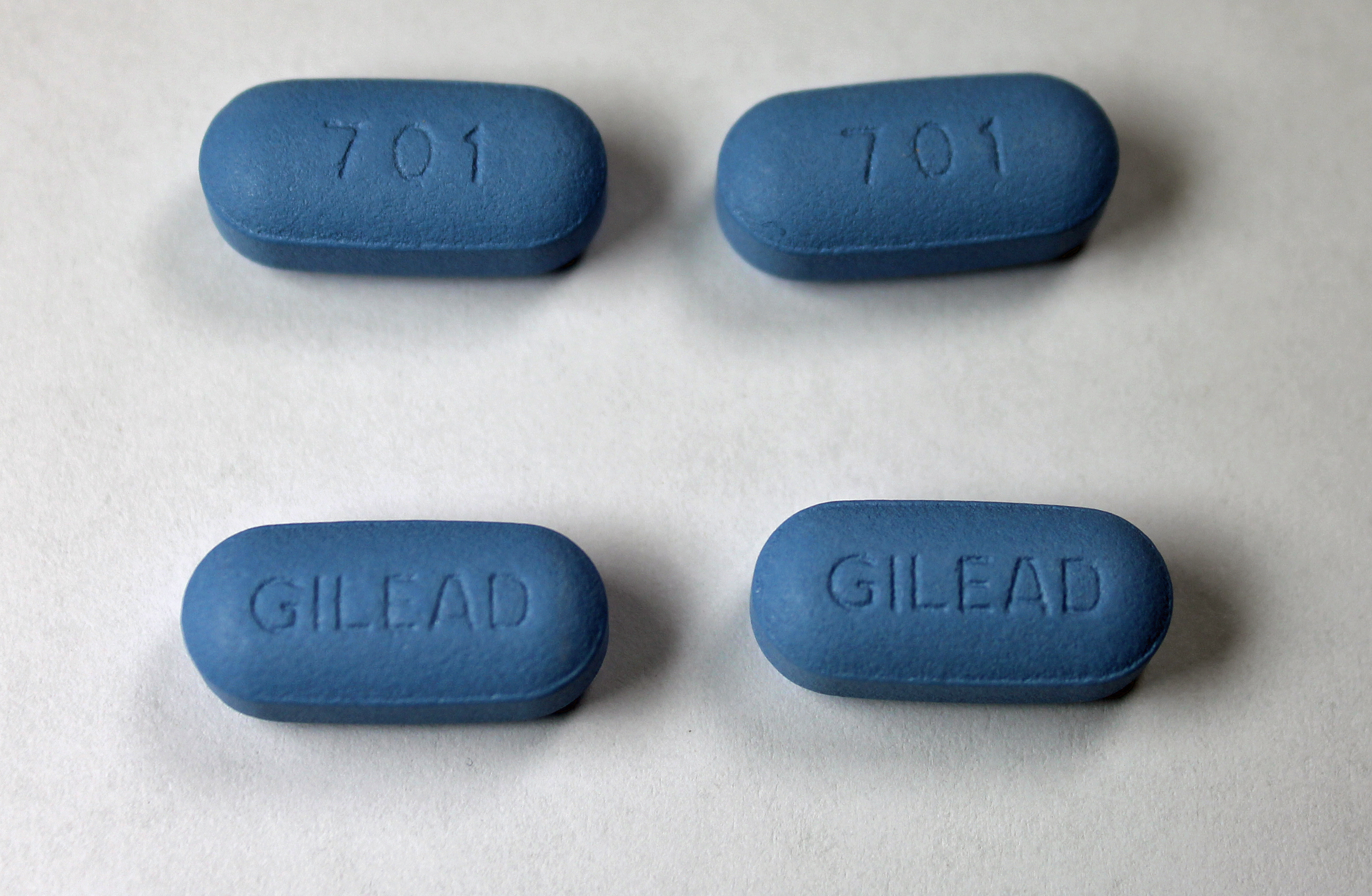

Combination of
- Emtricitabine: Nucleoside reverse transcriptase inhibitor
- Tenofovir disoproxil: Nucleotide analogue reverse transcriptase inhibitor

Clinical data
- Trade names: Truvada, others
- Other names: Emtricitabine/tenofovir disoproxil fumarate
- AHFS/Drugs.com: Monograph
- MedlinePlus: a612036
- License data: US DailyMed: Truvada
- Pregnancy category: AU: B3
- Routes of administration: By mouth
- ATC code: J05AR03 (WHO)

Legal status
- Legal status: AU: S4 (Prescription only); CA: ℞-only; UK: POM (Prescription only); US: ℞-only; EU: Rx-only; In general: ℞ (Prescription only)

Identifiers
- CAS Number: 731772-45-5
- PubChem CID: 11954236
- KEGG: D02297
- NIAID ChemDB: 214126

Emtricitabine/tenofovir (FTC/TDF), sold under the brand name Truvada among others, is a fixed-dose combination antiretroviral medication used to treat and prevent HIV/AIDS. It contains the antiretroviral medications emtricitabine and tenofovir disoproxil. For treatment, it must be used in combination with other antiretroviral medications. For prevention before exposure, in those who are at high risk, it is recommended along with safer sex practices. It does not cure HIV/AIDS. Emtricitabine/tenofovir is taken by mouth.

Common side effects include headache, tiredness, trouble sleeping, abdominal pain, weight loss, and rash. Serious side effects may include high blood lactate levels and enlargement of the liver. Use of this medication during pregnancy does not appear to harm the fetus, but this has not been well studied.

Emtricitabine/tenofovir was approved for medical use in the United States in 2004. It is on the World Health Organization's List of Essential Medicines. In the United States, emtricitabine/tenofovir was under patent by Gilead until 2020, but is now available as a generic worldwide. In 2023, it was the 205th most commonly prescribed medication in the United States, with more than two million prescriptions.

== Medical uses ==
Emtricitabine/tenofovir is used both to treat and to prevent HIV/AIDS. The U.S. National Institutes of Health (NIH) recommends antiretroviral therapy (ART) for all people with HIV/AIDS.

=== HIV prevention ===
The Centers for Disease Control and Prevention (CDC) recommends the use of emtricitabine/tenofovir for pre-exposure prophylaxis (PrEP) for uninfected, HIV-1 negative individuals that may be at risk for HIV-1 infection. A Cochrane systematic review found a 51% relative risk reduction of contracting HIV with both tenofovir alone and the tenofovir/emtricitabine combination. A JAMA systematic review found a similar relative risk reduction of 54% on average and greater reduction with greater adherence. It was approved for PrEP against HIV infection in the United States in 2012.

The CDC recommends PrEP be considered for the following high-risk groups:

- Individuals in an ongoing sexual relationship with an HIV-positive partner
- Gay or bisexual men who either have had anal sex without a condom or have been diagnosed with an STD in the past six months
- Heterosexual men or women who do not regularly use condoms during sex with partners of unknown HIV status who are substantial risk
- Injection of drugs in the last six months with sharing of equipment
- Serodiscordant heterosexual and homosexual partners, where one partner is HIV-positive and the other HIV-negative

The consideration of utilizing emtricitabine/tenofovir as a reduction strategy involves discussion with a health professional who can help the patient navigate the benefits and risks. Patients are advised to discuss any history of bone issues, kidney issues, or hepatitis B infection with their healthcare provider. Effectiveness of PrEP for prevention of infection is reliant on an individual's ability to take the medication consistently.

Emtricitabine/tenofovir is also used for HIV post-exposure prophylaxis. People who start taking emtricitabine/tenofovir see HIV reduction benefits up to 72 hours after starting, but the medicine must be taken for thirty days after a high-risk sexual event to ensure HIV transmission levels are optimally reduced.

Emtricitabine/tenofovir as PrEP should not be used for individuals who are positive for HIV-1.

=== HIV treatment ===
Emtricitabine/tenofovir has been approved in the United States as part of antiretroviral combination therapy for the treatment of HIV-1. The combination therapy is suggested as one of the options for adults who have not received any prior treatment for HIV infection.

=== Hepatitis B ===
Both emtricitabine and tenofovir are indicated for the treatment of hepatitis B, with the added benefit that they can target HIV for those with co-infection. Emtricitabine/tenofovir may also be considered for some antiviral resistant hepatitis B infections.

=== Pregnancy and breastfeeding ===
In the United States, it is recommended that all pregnant HIV-infected women start antiretroviral therapy (ART) as early in pregnancy as possible to reduce the risk of transmission. ART generally does not increase risk of birth defects with exception of dolutegravir, which is not recommended during first trimester of pregnancy only due to potential risk of neural tube defects.

Emtricitabine/tenofovir is secreted in breast milk. In developed countries, HIV-infected mothers are generally recommended to not breastfeed due to slight risk of mother-to-children HIV transmission. In developing countries, where avoiding breastfeeding may not be an option, the World Health Organization recommends a triple drug regimen of tenofovir, efavirenz, and either lamivudine or emtricitabine.

== Side effects ==
Emtricitabine/tenofovir is generally well tolerated. Some of its side effects include:

- Rare: lactic acidosis, liver dysfunction, worsening of hepatitis B infection
- Common: headache, abdominal pain, decreased weight, nausea, diarrhea, and decreased bone density

Fat redistribution and accumulation (lipodystrophy) has been observed in people receiving antiretroviral therapy, including fat reductions in the face, limbs, and buttocks and increases in visceral fat of the abdomen and accumulations in the upper back. When used as pre-exposure prophylaxis (PrEP) this effect may not be present. Weight changes have, however, been linked to the medication.

== Drug interactions ==
Drug–drug interactions
Drug–drug Interaction		Coadministration
Tenofovir	Didanosine	May increase didanosine concentration and risk of didanosine toxicity (e.g. pancreatitis, neuropathy).; Discontinue didanosine if patient develops didanosine-associated adverse events.; For patients who weigh more than 60 kg, didanosine dose should be reduced to 250 mg; there is no available data to recommend didanosine dose adjustments in patients who weigh less than 60 kg.
Tenofovir	Atazanavir	May decrease atazanavir and increase tenofovir concentrations.; Atazanavir should only be taken together with emtricitabine/tenofovir with ritonavir.; Monitor for tenofovir toxicity.
Tenofovir	Lopinavir/ritonavir, atazanavir coadministered with ritonavir & darunavir coadministered with ritonavir	May increase tenofovir concentrations.
Tenofovir	Ledipasvir/sofosbuvir	May increase tenofovir concentrations.; Consider alternative Hepatitis C antiviral or antiretroviral therapy.; Monitor for tenofovir toxicity.
Emtricitabine/tenofovir	P-glycoprotein and breast cancer resistance protein (BCRP) transporters inhibitors	May increase absorption of emtricitabine/tenofovir.
Emtricitabine/tenofovir	Drugs may decrease renal function (e.g. acyclovir, adefovir, dipivoxil, cidofovir, ganciclovir, valacyclovir, valganciclovir, aminoglycosides, etc.)	May increase emtricitabine and/or tenofovir concentrations.
Emtricitabine/tenofovir	High-dose or multiple NSAIDs	May increase the risk of acute kidney injury.
Emtricitabine/tenofovir	Orlistat	May inhibit the absorption of emtricitabine/tenofovir and result in loss of viral control.; Monitor HIV viral load frequently while the patient is taking orlistat.; Discontinue orlistat if HIV viral load increases.

Other drugs with adverse reactions include dabigatran etexilate, lamivudine, and vincristine. Dabigatran etexilate used with p-glycoprotein inducers requires monitoring of decreased levels and effects of dabigatran. Lamivudine may increase the adverse or toxic effect of emtricitabine. Vincristine used with P-glycoprotein/ABCB1 inducers can decrease the serum concentration of vincristine.

== History ==
Tenofovir, the parent compound of tenofovir disoproxil, was discovered through a collaboration between Czech chemist Antonín Holý of the Institute of Organic Chemistry and Biochemistry in Prague and Belgian virologist Erik De Clercq of the Rega Institute for Medical Research in Leuven. Emtricitabine was discovered by Raymond F. Schinazi, Dennis C. Liotta and Woo-Baeg Choi, and was licensed to Gilead Sciences by Emory University in 1996.

Gilead combined emtricitabine and tenofovir disoproxil fumarate as Truvada, which the U.S. Food and Drug Administration approved on 2 August 2004 for use with other antiretroviral drugs in the treatment of HIV-1 infection in adults.

== Society and culture ==
The patent for the drug combination is owned by Gilead Sciences in some regions. The European patent EP0915894B1 expired in July 2018, but Gilead Sciences wished the patent to be extended. Four rival labs – Teva, Accord Healthcare, Lupin and Mylan – had sought to have that overturned in the courts in Britain, and the High Court of Justice invalidated Gilead's patent. Gilead appealed and the UK referred the case to the European Court of Justice, which refused to extend the patent. An Irish court rejected an injunction request to prevent the launch of generic Emtricitabine/tenofovir prior to the resolution of the case.

In 2019, Gilead Sciences challenged the validity of patents granted to the United States after 2015 for using the drug combination for HIV PrEP and post-exposure prophylaxis (PEP). In July 2024, The Biden administration appealed the jury finding that ruled in favor of Gilead Sciences verdict that the U.S. government's patents are invalid.

In the United States, most healthcare plans are required to cover PrEP without any copay or other cost sharing. This is due to a United States Preventive Services Task Force recommendation that gave PrEP a grade A rating. Under the Affordable Care Act, this recommendation requires all non-grandfathered private health plans to cover PrEP without cost sharing.

In the United Kingdom, PrEP is widely available to all at-risk groups following the Department for Health and Social Care's decision to make it available across England in 2020. Wales, Scotland, and Northern Ireland made it available in 2017 and 2018.
