= Michal Hocek =

Czech chemist

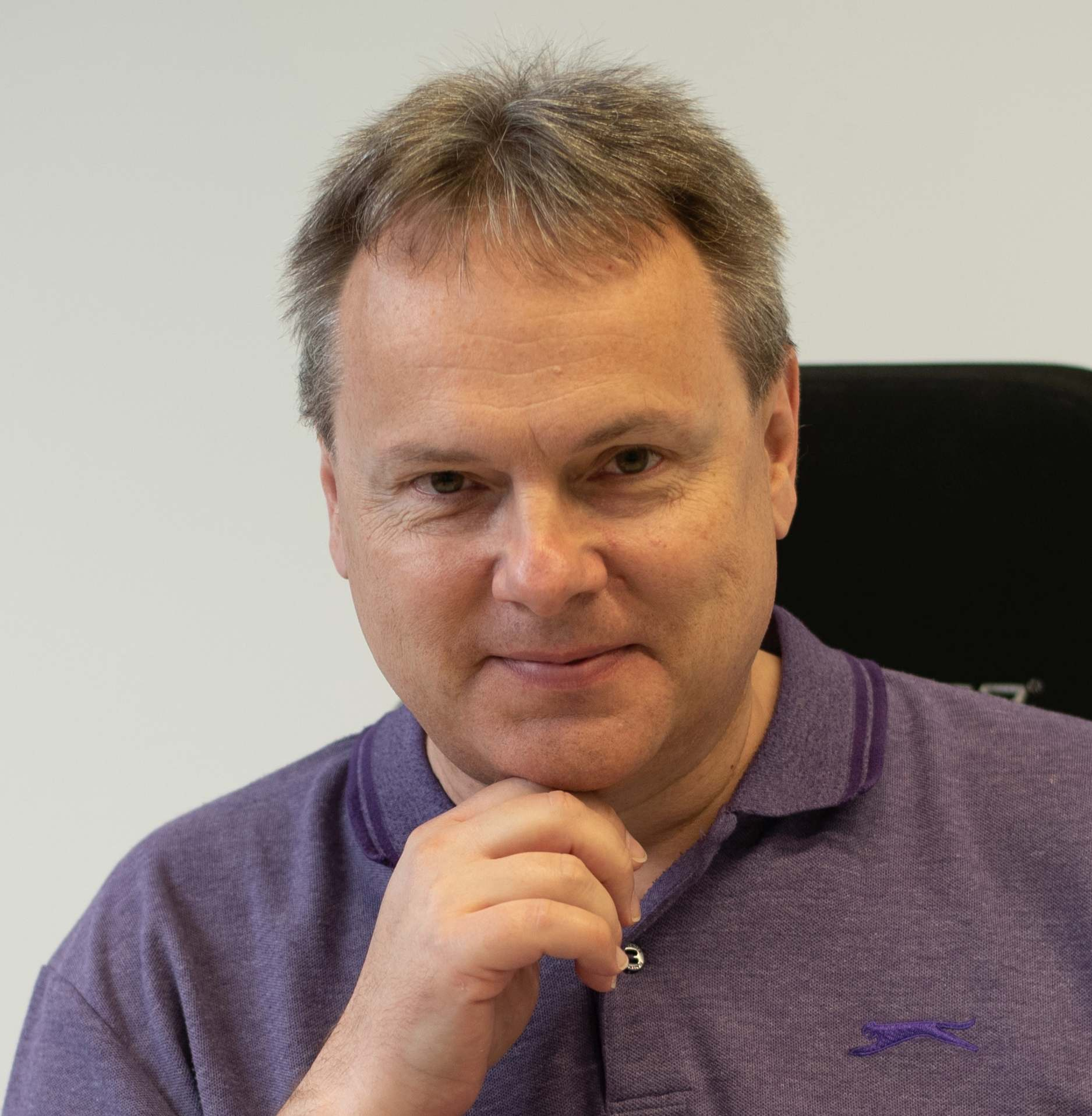
- Born: Michal Hocek; December 11, 1969 (age 56); Benešov, Czechoslovakia
- Education: University of Chemistry and Technology, Prague MSc; Institute of Organic Chemistry and Biochemistry AV CR, Prague PhD
- Scientific career
- Fields: Organic chemistry; Medicinal chemistry; Chemical biology
- Workplaces: Institute of Organic Chemistry and Biochemistry AV CR, Prague; Charles University
- Doctoral advisor: Antonín Holý
- Website: hocekgroup.uochb.cas.cz

Michal Hocek (born 11 December 1969 in Benešov, Czechoslovakia) is a Czech chemist. He is a group leader at the Institute of Organic Chemistry and Biochemistry of the Czech Academy of Sciences and a professor of organic chemistry at Charles University in Prague. He specializes in the chemistry and chemical biology of nucleosides, nucleotides, and nucleic acids.

== Career ==
=== Education and early career ===
Michal Hocek studied at the former Prague Institute of Chemical Technology (now University of Chemistry and Technology, Prague or UCT, Prague) under the supervision of Josef Kuthan. In 1993, he graduated with an MSc degree specializing in organic and medicinal chemistry. He enrolled in a PhD program at the Institute of Organic Chemistry and Biochemistry of the Czech Academy of Sciences (IOCB Prague) under the tutelage of Dr. Antonín Holý, completing his studies in 1996. In 1997, Hocek performed a one-year postdoctoral fellowship under the guidance of Léon Ghosez at the Université catholique de Louvain (Louvain-la-Neuve, Belgium). He returned to the IOCB and Holý's laboratory, where he worked as a staff scientist for five years from 1998 to 2002.

In 2002, Hocek was promoted to group leader of the Group of Modified Nucleobases at the IOCB. From 2004 to 2006, he served as the head of the Department of Organic Synthesis for Biomedicinal Applications at the IOCB. In 2006, he completed a Doctor of Science degree (DSc) at the Academy of Sciences of the Czech Republic at UCT Prague. In the same year, he served as an associate professor at UCT Prague.

=== 2007 onward ===
In 2007, Hocek was promoted to the Head of Research Team at the IOCB, thus beginning his independent research career. From 2011 to 2014, he served as an associate professor in the Department of Organic and Nuclear Chemistry at Charles University in Prague. He became a full professor in 2014.

Hocek has been an editor for several academic journals. From 1998 to 2011, he served as editor-in-chief of the Collection of the Czechoslovak Chemical Communications, and from 2011, he has served on the Editorial Advisory Board of the journals ChemPlusChem and ChemBioChem. In 2013, he was named an F1000 faculty member for chemical biology. He is a currently a member of the Czech Chemical Society, the American Chemical Society, and the International Society for Nucleosides, Nucleotides, and Nucleic Acids.

In September 2016, Hocek was featured on Hyde Park Civilizace, a Czech television show featuring prominent Czech and international scientists. As of May 2025, he has produced over 290 publications and numerous patents. His research articles have garnered over 9500 citations, and he has achieved an h-index of 51.

== Research achievements ==
Hocek and his group have contributed significantly to organic chemistry and medicinal chemistry by developing methods to synthesize modified nucleobases, nucleosides, nucleotides, and nucleic acids through cross-coupling reactions and C-H activation. They discovered several novel classes of cytostatic agents with nanomolar antitumor activities based on substituted or fused deazapurine nucleosides.

In the field of chemical biology, Hocek and his laboratories have developed a simple two-step synthesis of base-modified DNA through cross-coupling reactions of 2'-deoxyribonucleoside triphosphates (dNTPs) followed by polymerase incorporation. They have discovered some modified dNTPs that are better substrates for polymerases than natural nucleotides. The methodology is widely used for enzymatic synthesis of DNA or RNA-bearing fluorescent, redox, or reactive labels, as well as for modulation of transcription.

== Awards and recognition ==
- 1999: Alfred Bader Prize for Organic Chemistry from the Czech Chemical Society
- 2004: Otto Wichterle Premium for Younger Scientists
- 2004: Prize of the Academy of Sciences for Younger Scientists
- Since 2008: Chairman of the Symposium on the Chemistry of Nucleic Acid Components
- 2015: Praemium Academia from the Czech Academy of Sciences
- 2015: Fellow of ChemPubSoc Europe
- 2017: Elected member of the Learned Society of the Czech Republic
- 2019: Rudolf Lukes Prize of the Czech Chemical Society
