= Institute of Organic Chemistry and Biochemistry =

Czech research institute

Coordinates: 50°6′20″N 14°23′29″E

Institute of Organic Chemistry and Biochemistry of the Czech Academy of Sciences
- Ústav organické chemie a biochemie Akademie věd České republiky
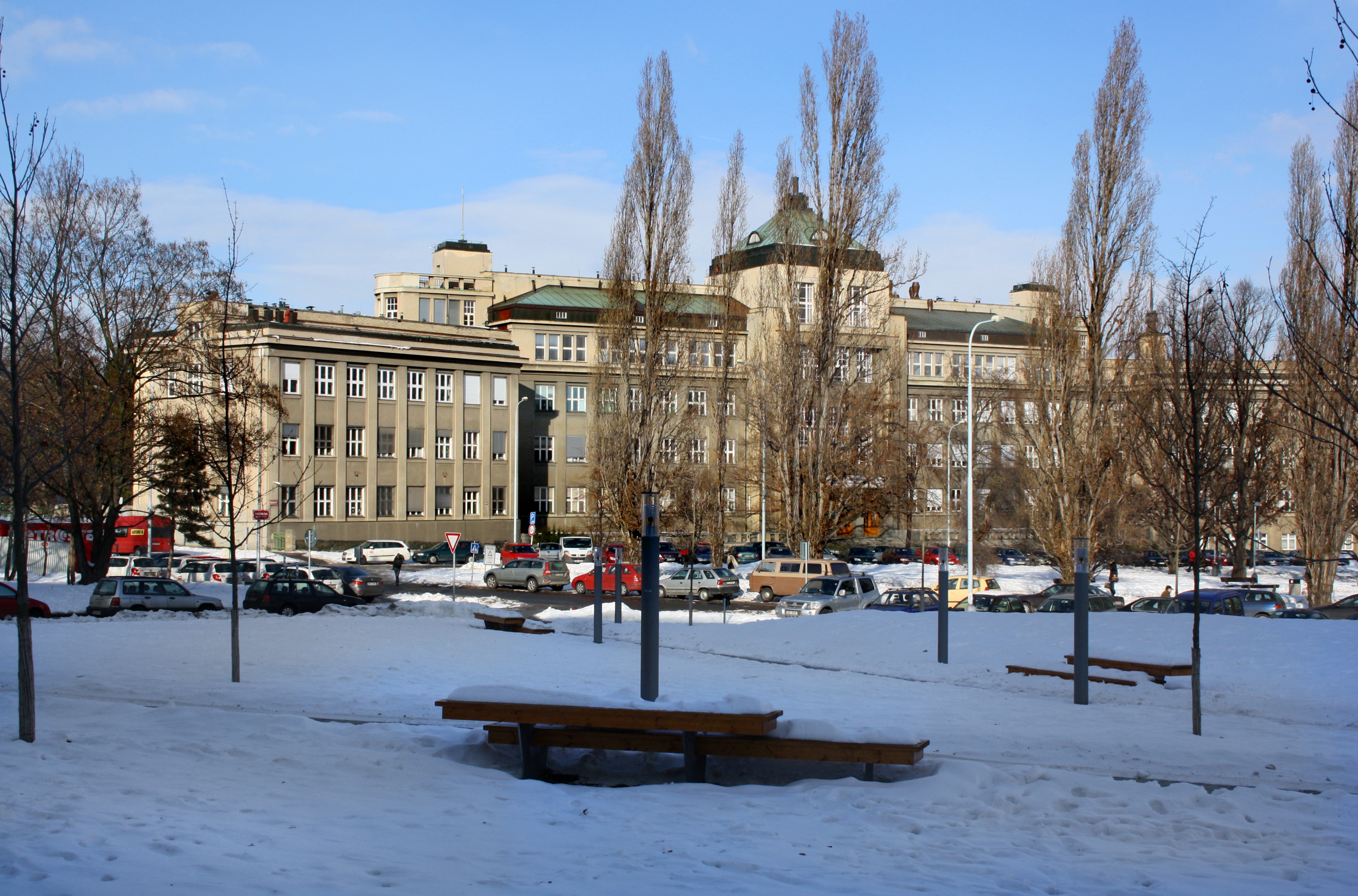
- Other names: IOCB Prague, ÚOCHB
- Type: Public research institution
- Established: 1953
- Parent institution: Czech Academy of Sciences
- Budget: CZK 1.67 billion (2026)
- Director: Jan Konvalinka
- Total staff: 1,004 (2025)
- Location: Prague, Czech Republic
- Website: www.uochb.cz

The Institute of Organic Chemistry and Biochemistry of the Czech Academy of Sciences (IOCB Prague; Czech: Ústav organické chemie a biochemie Akademie věd České republiky) is a public research institution in Prague, Czech Republic. Founded in 1953, it is part of the Czech Academy of Sciences and conducts basic research in organic and medicinal chemistry, biochemistry, chemical biology and related fields. It also works with universities on research and the supervision of master's and doctoral students.

IOCB researchers helped discover cidofovir, adefovir and tenofovir, which Gilead Sciences developed into antiviral medicines. These include treatments for HIV infection and chronic hepatitis B. The cancer medicines azacitidine and decitabine also originated from research at IOCB.

== Research ==
IOCB conducts basic research in organic, bioorganic and medicinal chemistry, biochemistry, and chemical biology. Its work also covers theoretical, computational, physical and analytical chemistry, materials science, bioconjugation and nanotechnology.

Research groups study nucleic acids, proteins, cellular processes and natural products, among other subjects. Their work ranges from developing chemical reactions and studying molecular interactions to investigating disease mechanisms and designing potential medicines.

The institute is organized into independent research groups, broadly divided into chemistry, biology and physics clusters. Shared facilities provide mass spectrometry, nuclear magnetic resonance spectroscopy, cryogenic electron microscopy and scientific computing. Junior groups are established for five years, after which they are assessed for promotion to senior status. An international advisory board reviews senior groups every five years.

=== Drug discovery ===
Antonín Holý’s research at IOCB, carried out with Erik De Clercq and colleagues at the Rega Institute in Leuven, led to a group of antiviral compounds known as acyclic nucleoside phosphonates. Gilead Sciences developed three of these into medicines: cidofovir, adefovir and tenofovir. Cidofovir was approved to treat cytomegalovirus retinitis, an eye infection affecting people with AIDS. Adefovir was approved for chronic hepatitis B.

Gilead developed the prodrugs tenofovir disoproxil and tenofovir alafenamide, which are converted into tenofovir in the body. They are used in medicines for HIV infection and chronic hepatitis B, including Viread, Truvada and Biktarvy. Truvada combines tenofovir disoproxil with emtricitabine and is also used to prevent HIV infection.

In the 1960s, Alois Pískala and colleagues at IOCB synthesized azacitidine and decitabine, which later entered clinical use as treatments for blood cancers. They are used to treat myelodysplastic syndromes and acute myeloid leukaemia.

Léčiva began manufacturing oxytocin in Prague in 1958. The production method came from Josef Rudinger’s team at IOCB. Karel Jošt’s group synthesized carbetocin, an analogue of oxytocin used to prevent bleeding after childbirth.

IOCB’s research on vasopressin led to terlipressin and desmopressin. Milan Zaoral and colleagues discovered desmopressin, which was licensed to the Swedish company Ferring. Industrial production began in Czechoslovakia and Sweden in the early 1970s.

Other applications included Holý’s nucleoside analogue dihydroxypropyladenine (DHPA), used in topical treatments for herpes simplex infections, and a method for large-scale synthesis of guaiazulene, used in the ointment Dermazulen, introduced in 1969.

== History ==
=== Origins and early research ===
The institute grew out of a group of chemists led by František Šorm at the Czech Technical University in Prague after the Second World War. Several had worked together in industrial laboratories during the German occupation, when Czech universities were closed. In 1950, Šorm’s institution became the Central Institute of Chemistry.

On 1 January 1953, it joined the newly established Czechoslovak Academy of Sciences as the Institute of Organic Chemistry, with Šorm as director. It became the Chemical Institute in 1955 and adopted the name Institute of Organic Chemistry and Biochemistry in 1960.

Under Šorm, the institute studied natural products, peptides, proteins and components of nucleic acids. Chemists and biochemists worked together to prepare new compounds and investigate their properties and possible uses. Šorm lost his leadership positions after speaking out against the Warsaw Pact invasion of Czechoslovakia in 1968. He continued working at the institute, which his former colleagues went on to lead.

=== Antiviral research ===
Holý’s collaboration with the Belgian virologist Erik De Clercq began after they met in Göttingen in 1976. De Clercq tested compounds from Holý’s Prague laboratory at the Rega Institute in Leuven. Their research yielded cidofovir, adefovir and tenofovir, which Gilead Sciences developed into medicines after signing licensing agreements with the two institutes in 1991 and 1992.

IOCB joined the Czech Academy of Sciences in 1993, after Czechoslovakia split into two countries. Holý was its director from 1994 to 2002. Royalties from the antiviral medicines paid for further research, laboratory equipment and the redevelopment of the Prague campus.

=== Reorganization and expansion ===
In January 2007, under director Zdeněk Havlas, IOCB became a public research institution. It also reorganized its research groups, opening group-leader positions to international competition. Regular evaluations by an international advisory board and a tenure-track system for junior groups became part of its research organization.

The institute founded its technology-transfer company, IOCB TTO, in 2009. It began work in January 2010 and changed its name to IOCB Tech in 2017.

On 18 October 2024, IOCB opened a branch in Cambridge, Massachusetts, under the name IOCB Boston. Its first laboratory was headed by David Sabatini, who also led a research group in Prague. The branch received a donation from the Pershing Square Foundation. IOCB also contributed money earned from its applied research.
