= Johan Neyts =

Belgian virologist (born 1966)

Johan Hendrik Neyts (born Blankenberge on 21 January 1966) is a Belgian virologist. He is head of The Neyts-lab of Virology, Antiviral Drug and Vaccine Research, which is part of the Laboratory of Virology and Chemotherapy at the Rega Institute for Medical Research, and full professor of virology at the Faculty of Medicine of KU Leuven. During the 2019-2020 coronavirus pandemic, Neyts came to national prominence as an expert on the (re)search for antiviral drugs and vaccines against SARS-CoV-2.

== Career ==
From 1994 till 1999, Neyts worked as a post-doctoral researcher in the Laboratory of Virology and Chemotherapy at the Rega Institute, and from 1995 till 1996 in the Lab of Prof. Dr. Pagano at the Lineberger Comprehensive Cancer Center (USA). His academic career as professor of virology at the Faculty of Medicine of KU Leuven spans more than 2 decades. In 2009 he was co-founder and Chief Scientific Officer of Okapi Sciences (Antivirals for Animals), a KU Leuven spin-off (acquired in 2014 by Aratana Therapeutics). The Okapi Sciences team later founded Virovet. Both Okapi Sciences and Virovet are spin-offs of KU Leuven. In 2018 Neyts was elected President (for 2 years) of the International Society for Antiviral Research. In 2019 he was appointed Honorary Professor at the School of Pharmaceutical Sciences, Shandong University, P.R. China. Neyts teaches a number of classes of virology at the KU Leuven school of medicine and the school of dentistry.

== Research ==
Neyts Lab obtained funding from various national and international organizations. Under the guidance of Dr. Pieter Leyssen, a unique lab-in-a-box that allows high throughput screening in a high biosafety environment was designed and built. Together with the Leuven Center for Drug Design & Development the Neyts Lab performs various joint programs. Most prominent has been the development of an ultra-potent pan-dengue virus compound, which is currently in clinical trials at Janssen Pharmaceutica.

=== 2019-2020 coronavirus pandemic ===
By the end of January 2020, when the Belgian press began to report about the imminent coronavirus pandemic, Neyts came to national and international prominence as an expert on the (re)search for antiviral drugs and vaccines against SARS-CoV-2. In March 2020, the Bill and Melinda Gates Foundation commissioned a large coronavirus study from KU Leuven, which was carried out by the Neyts Lab: over 15,000 known therapeutic molecules were tested on possible antiviral activity against the novel coronavirus in the CapsIt infrastructure, the unique fully automatic high biosafety laboratory of the Rega Institute. At the same time, the Neyts Lab rapidly engaged in the construction of a vaccine against SARS-CoV-2. The team also developed as one of the first a robust small animal (hamster) model. On April 11, 2020, a new council of nine leading scientists (including Johan Neyts) was commissioned by the Flemish government to prepare the country for the next peak of the virus. The COVID-council could outsource 2.5 million euros to further research into the efficacy of a vaccine, the domestic production of mouth masks and an analysis of the impact of the lockdown.

== Recognition ==
- Laureate of the Dr. P. Janssen Award for Medicinal Chemistry, 1993
- Dr. J.B. Van Helmont Award (Royal Belgian Academy of Medicine), 1994
- Award Centrum "Princess Joséphine-Charlotte" (Belgian National Fund for Scientific Research), 1995 (Shared with Catherine Sadzot-Delvaux, Robert Snoeck and Graciela Andrei)
- Prijs van het Fonds Dr. en Mevr. Schamelhout-Koettlitz, Koninklijke Academie voor Geneeskunde van Belgie, 2002 (Shared with Paul Proost and Dominique Schols)
- William Prusoff Memorial Award from the International Society for Antiviral Research (ISAR), Savannah, GA, USA, April 2003
- Award Centrum "Princess Joséphine-Charlotte" (Fund for Scientific Research), 2005 (Shared with Pieter Leyssen and Nathalie Charlier)
