= International Society for Antiviral Research =

International scientific society

International Society for Antiviral Research (ISAR)
- Formation: 1987; 39 years ago
- Type: Scientific society
- Headquarters: Logan, Utah
- Location: United States
- Members: >400
- President of the International Society for Antiviral Research: Luis M Schang
- Key people: President-elect David Durantel
- Website: www.isar-icar.com

The International Society for Antiviral Research (ISAR) is a scientific society that focuses on the discovery, development, evaluation, and clinical application of antiviral agents. It was founded in 1987 to encourage the exchange of information and collaborative research on the development of biological and chemical antiviral agents across the globe.

ISAR sponsors the International Conference on Antiviral Research (ICAR), held yearly since 1988 when the second ICAR occurred in Williamsburg, Virginia. ISAR also provides scientific information through peer-reviewed scientific journals and administers several international awards.

As of May 25, 2026, the president of the society was David Durantel, the president-elect was Robert Jordan, and the past president, Luis M Schang Previously, Johan Neyts was president from 2018-2020, succeeded as president by Kara Carter (2020-2022), and then Katherine Seley-Radtke (2022-2024).

== Founding ==
The foundation for the International Society for Antiviral Research (ISAR) was laid at meetings held in Rotterdam, Netherlands (April 30 – May 3, 1985) and in Il Ciocco, Italy (May 10-23, 1987) by NATO. The society, in the persons of William M. Shannon, Earl R. Kern, and Richard J. Whitley registered articles of incorporation in the United States in the state of Alabama, on May 14, 1987. The society's stated purpose was "the promotion and advancement of scientific knowledge in the area of antiviral scientific research for the benefit of all human beings".

The original Board of Directors of ISAR included Alfons Billiau (KU Leuven, Leuven, Belgium), Erik De Clercq (Rega Institute, KU Leuven), A. Kirk Field (Squibb Institute for Medical Research, Princeton, New Jersey), George J. Galasso (National Institutes of Health (U.S.)), Earl R. Kern (University of Utah, Salt Lake City, Utah), William M. Shannon (Southern Research Institute, Birmingham, Alabama), and Richard J. Whitley (University of Alabama at Birmingham). Richard Whitley became the first president of ISAR, serving from 1988-1990, with De Clercq as president elect.

== Conferences ==
The International Conference on Antiviral Research (ICAR) has been held every year since 1988. Its location circulates between the United States, Europe, and the rest of the world, reflecting the distribution of its members. The last annual meeting, 39th ICAR was held in Prague, Czechia, April 27- May 1, 2026. The next annual meeting, 40th ICAR, will be held in April 12- 15, 2026 in Calgary, Alberta, Canada.

It is generally agreed that the second ICAR was a meeting held in Williamsburg, Virginia in 1988, which was advertised as such.

Neither the Rotterdam meeting (1985) nor the Italy meeting (1987) was identified at the time as "the first" International Conference for Antiviral Research (ICAR). Since then, each meeting has been described as the first ICAR meeting by different proponents. George Galasso and others consider Rotterdam the first meeting because at that meeting Galasso, Erik De Clercq and Alfons Billiau discussed formation of a Society and decided to approach Earl Kern and Richard Whitley. Erik De Clercq has emphasized the 1987 NATO meeting at Il Ciocco because ideas for both ISAR and ICAR were developed there.

== Publications ==
- Antiviral Research, established 1981.
- Antiviral Chemistry and Chemotherapy, established January 1990.
- Antiviral Therapy, established 1996.
- ISAR NEWS (Newsletter of the International Society for Antiviral Research)

== Awards given ==
- ISAR Award of Excellence, awarded intermittently: William Prusoff, 1988; Gertrude Elion, 1991; Erik De Clercq, 1998; Richard J. Whitley, 1998, Peter Piot, 2026.
- Gertrude Elion Memorial Award (2000-), awarded annually: Masanori Baba, 2013; Douglas Richman, 2016; Michael J. Sofia, 2017; Johan Neyts, 2024, Tomas Cihlar, 2025, and Pei-Yong Shi, 2026.
- William Prusoff Young Investigator Award (2001-)
- Antonín Holý Memorial Award (2014-)
- Alice Ball Excellence Award, (2017-)

== Presidents ==
- Richard J. Whitley 1988-1990
- Erik De Clercq 1990-1992
- George J. Galasso 1992-1994
- Hugh J. Field 1994-1996
- Earl R. Kern 1996-1998
- John C. Martin 1998-2000
- Karen K. Biron 2000-2002
- John C. Drach 2002-2004
- John A. Secrist III 2004-2006
- Christopher McGuigan 2006-2008
- Amy K. Patick 2008-2010
- Joseph M. Colacino 2010-2012
- Phillip Furman 2012-2014
- Robert W. Buckheit, Jr. 2014-2016
- José Esté 2016-2018
- Johan Neyts 2018-2020
- Kara Carter 2020-2022
- Katherine Seley-Radtke 2022-2024
- Luis M Schang 2024-2026
- David Durantel 2026-2028
