= Erik De Clercq =

American biochemist

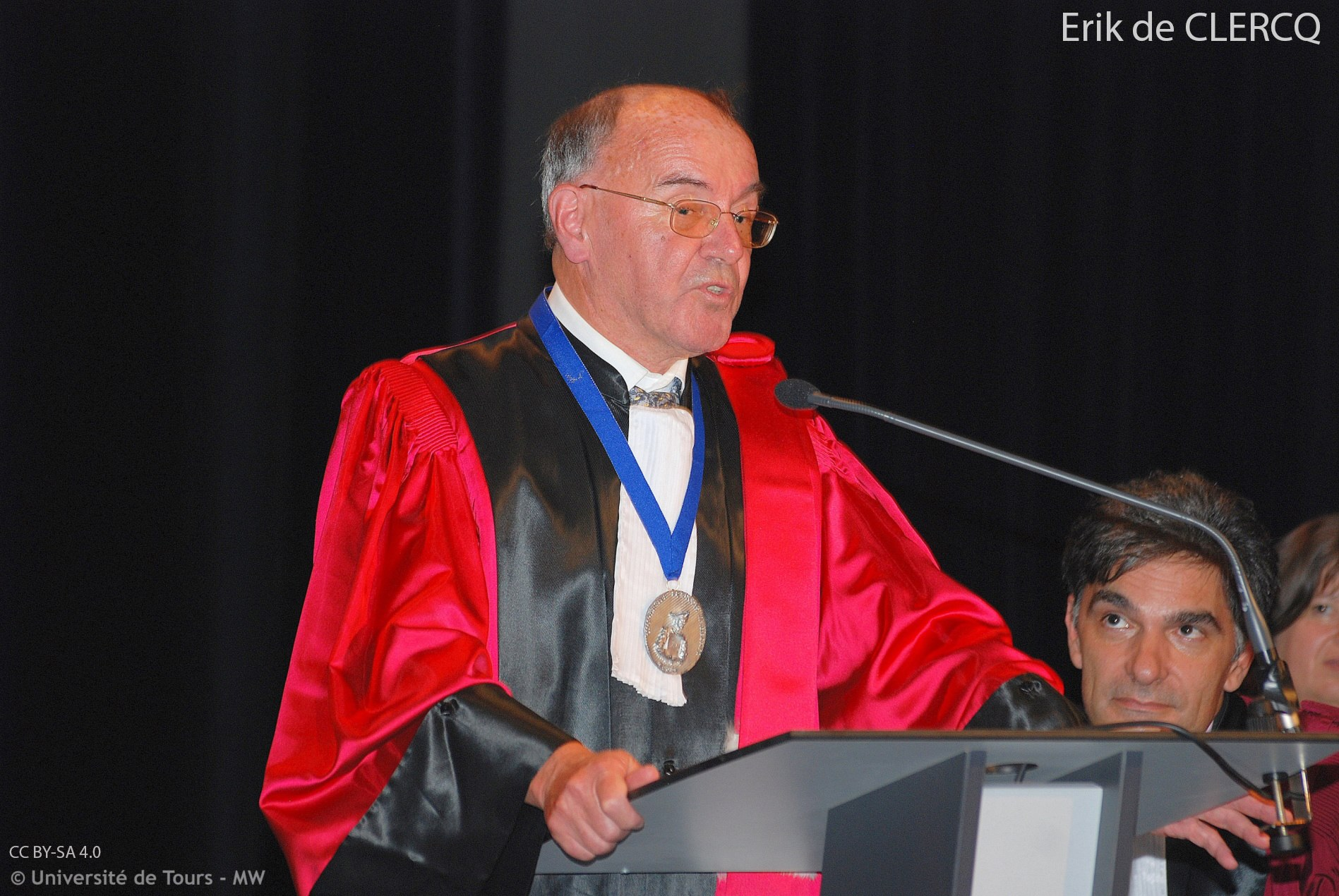
- Erik De Clercq (2010)
- Born: 1941 (age 84–85)
- Education: Catholic University of Leuven
- Awards: European Inventor Award
- Scientific career
- Fields: Virology
- Workplaces: Rega Institute for Medical Research

Erik De Clercq M.D. Ph.D., (1941) is a Belgian physician and biologist. He studied medicine at the Catholic University of Leuven (Leuven, Belgium). He did research and later became a professor at the Department of Medicine, where he specialised in microbiology and immunology. He worked at the Rega Institute for Medical Research. He is one of the founders and the second president of the International Society for Antiviral Research.

Since 1976 Erik De Clercq has collaborated on the development of new antiretroviral drugs with Antonín Holý, of the Institute of Organic Chemistry and Biochemistry (IOCB Prague) of the Czechoslovak Academy of Sciences in Prague, Czech Republic. Together they discovered amongst others Tenofovir.

In 2008 he received the European Inventor Award Lifetime Achievement for landmark contributions to antiviral treatment, including the development of the drug cocktail for AIDS.

In 2010 De Clercq was awarded the 2010 Dr. Paul Janssen Award for Biomedical Research. He was recognized for his landmark discoveries in anti-HIV medications, including nucleotide analogues, and inventions or co-inventions of several approved drugs for anti-viral therapy.
