= Tomáš Čajka =

Czech chemist

Tomáš Čajka (Ph.D. in 2009), is a Czech chemist, who is active in the field of analytical chemistry; he is an associate professor of the Department of metabolomics, Institute of physiology CAS (Prague).

== Works ==
- Novel approaches to streamlining gas chromatographic analysis of food and environmental contaminants, Ph.D. thesis, 2009.

== Awards ==
- The Young Authors’ Best Paper in Spectroscopy - The Ioannes Marcus Marci Spectroscopic Society (2007).

== Literature ==
- Tomas Cajka // The Analytical Scientist - Texere Publishing Limited, 2018.

== Web-sources ==
- "Tomáš Čajka. CV". tomas.cajka.sweb.cz.
