= Jiří Bečka =

Czech orientalist, translator and writer

- Born: 16 October 1915
- Died: 21 December 2004 (aged 89)
- Education: Charles University
- Occupations: Orientalist, Iranologist
- Known for: Studies of Iran, Tajikistan, Afghanistan, Persian literature, and the history of Iranian studies

Jiří Bečka (16 October 1915 – 21 December 2004) was a Czech orientalist and Iranologist.

== Biography ==
He studied law at Charles University in Prague. Nevertheless, because of World War II, he received his doctorate very late, in 1945. After World War II, he and a few of his friends founded a new magazine, Nový Orient (the New East Orient).

He also studied at Charles University School of Philosophy and received a doctorate in this field. From 1952 to 1976 he retired from the Institute of Oriental Studies at the Czechoslovak Academy of Sciences. The subject of his studies was the history and culture of Iran, Tajikistan and Afghanistan, as well as the history of Iranian studies in Czech and Slovak. Bečka has written numerous books and articles on Persian literature, some of which he has translated from Persian into Czech. His research has been published in several European languages.

== Works ==
- Afghánistán, Prague: NPL, 1965.
- A Study in Pashto Stress, Prague: Academia, 1969.
- Táríhi adabijáti tágíkistán, Přel. z angl. do urdštiny Kabír Ahmad Ğájsí, Dihlí: Anğumani teraqíji urdú, 1977.
- Spisovatel a učenec Sadriddín Ajní, Prague: Academia, 1978.
- Úvod do paštského jazyka, Prague: Academia, 1979.
- Íránský svět v české a slovenské literatuře a vědě: čs. bibliografie íránských lit., Prague: Sdružení českých překladatelů při Českém literárním fondu, 1988
- Adabíját-e fársí dar Tádžíkestán (Persian Literature in Tadjikistan), Tehran: Markaz-e motáleát va tahqíqát-e farhanqí-je sejnolmelalí, 1993.
- Iranica bohemica et slovaca: litterae, Prague: Czechoslovak Academy of Sciences, Orientální ústav, 1996.
- Islám a české země, Votobia, Olomouc 1998.
- Persko-český slovník, sestavil Jiří Bečka; upravil a doplnil redakční kolektiv: Mohammad Hassani, Mehdi Meshkato-Dini, Petr Pelikán, Velvyslanectví Íránské islámské republiky v Praze, 2004.
