= Secrist =

Secrist is a surname. Notable people with the surname include:

- Don Secrist (1944–2025), American baseball player
- Horace Secrist (1881–1943), American economist
- John Secrist, American chemist
