= ODE-CDV =

Names
- Preferred IUPAC name 2-(Octadecyloxy)ethyl ({[(2S)-1-(4-amino-2-oxopyrimidin-1(2H)-yl)-3-hydroxypropan-2-yl]oxy}methyl)phosphonate

Identifiers
CAS Number	444805-26-9
3D model (JSmol)	Interactive image
ChEMBL	ChEMBL206291
ChemSpider	424002
PubChem CID	483476
CompTox Dashboard (EPA)	DTXSID701028092
- InChI: InChI=1S/C28H54N3O7P/c1-2-3-4-5-6-7-8-9-10-11-12-13-14-15-16-17-20-36-21-22-38-39(34,35)25-37-26(24-32)23-31-19-18-27(29)30-28(31)33/h18-19,26,32H,2-17,20-25H2,1H3,(H,34,35)(H2,29,30,33)/t26-/m0/s1 Key: BLYNHZVAZVOTGV-SANMLTNESA-N; InChI=1/C28H54N3O7P/c1-2-3-4-5-6-7-8-9-10-11-12-13-14-15-16-17-20-36-21-22-38-39(34,35)25-37-26(24-32)23-31-19-18-27(29)30-28(31)33/h18-19,26,32H,2-17,20-25H2,1H3,(H,34,35)(H2,29,30,33)/t26-/m0/s1 Key: BLYNHZVAZVOTGV-SANMLTNEBA
- SMILES: CCCCCCCCCCCCCCCCCCOCCOP(=O)(CO[C@@H](Cn1ccc(nc1=O)N)CO)O

Properties
Chemical formula	C_{28}H_{54}N_{3}O_{7}P
Molar mass	575.728 g·mol^{−1}
- Except where otherwise noted, data are given for materials in their standard state (at 25 °C [77 °F], 100 kPa). Infobox references

ODE-CDV (octadecyloxyethyl-cidofovir) is a cidofovir derivative with antiviral activity.
