= John C. Martin (businessman) =

American billionaire businessman

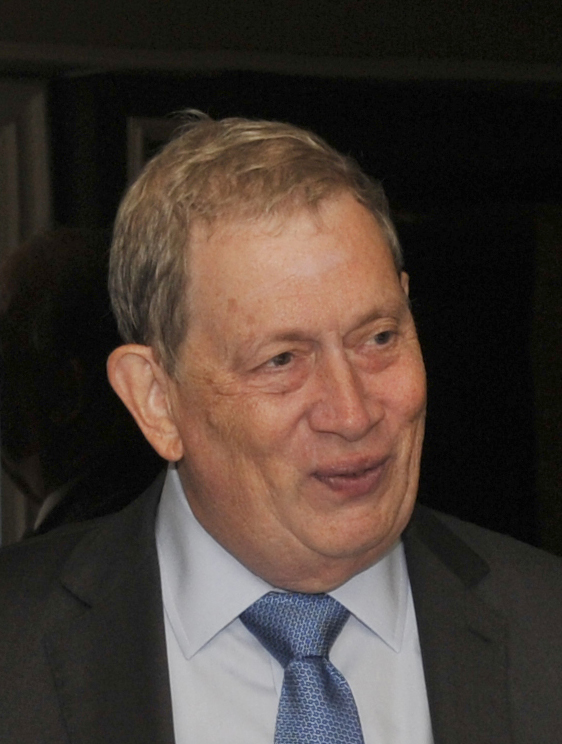
- Martin in 2017
- Born: May 7, 1951; Easton, Pennsylvania, US
- Died: March 30, 2021 (aged 69); Palo Alto, California, US
- Education: Purdue University; Golden Gate University; University of Chicago
- Known for: Antiviral therapeutics
- Title: Chairman, Gilead Sciences
- Awards: Biotechnology Heritage Award (2017)

John Charles Martin (May 7, 1951 – March 30, 2021) was an American billionaire businessman, and the former executive chairman (2016–2018) and CEO (1996–2016) of the American biotechnology company Gilead Sciences. He joined Gilead Sciences in 1990 as vice president for research and development. Gilead is known for developing drugs such as Atripla (for HIV/AIDS) and commercializing Sovaldi (sofosbuvir) for the treatment of the liver virus hepatitis C. Martin is the recipient of a number of awards, including the Biotechnology Heritage Award (2017).

== Education ==
Martin earned a bachelor's degree in chemical engineering from Purdue University, an MBA in marketing from Golden Gate University and a PhD in organic chemistry from the University of Chicago under the supervision of Josef Fried. He served on the board of trustees of the latter two universities.

== Career ==
=== Syntex Corporation ===
Martin worked at Syntex Corporation from 1978 to 1984.

=== Bristol-Myers Squibb ===
Martin was director of antiviral chemistry at Bristol-Myers Squibb from 1984 to 1990.

=== Gilead Sciences Inc ===
External audio
- "Pandemic Perspectives with John C. Martin", interview, Science History Institute, May 5, 2020.

Martin joined the American biotechnology company Gilead Sciences in 1990 as its vice president for research and development. He was Gilead's CEO from 1996 to 2016. He became chairman in May 2008, and executive chairman in 2016.

At Gilead, Martin helped to develop Atripla, a single pill combining Gilead's drug Truvada (a combination of tenofovir and emtricitabine) with Bristol-Myers Squibb's Sustiva (efavirenz). Truvada and Sustiva were already "the most widely prescribed antiretroviral treatment regimen in the U.S." for the treatment of HIV and AIDS. One of the benefits of a combined pill was that patients would be more likely to consistently comply with treatment by taking a full dose of the prescribed drugs, which in turn would lessen the chance that drug-resistant HIV strains would develop. The two companies announced that they would collaborate on the drug in 2004. An initial formulation of once-a-day single-dose Atripla was approved by the FDA on July 12, 2006. Purchase of Atripla was included in the President's Emergency Plan for AIDS Relief (PEPFAR) program. According to The New York Times, Gilead had about half of the US market for HIV medication manufacture by 2011.

In 2014, Martin led the commercialization of Sovaldi (sofosbuvir) — "a treatment for the liver virus hepatitis C that can cure 90% of patients and generated $12 billion in revenue in its first year on the market." Martin is credited with taking Sovaldi from "zero-to-blockbuster in a couple of months" with profits topping $10 billion for 2014. However, in April 2014, U.S. House Democrats Henry Waxman, Frank Pallone Jr., and Diana DeGette wrote Martin questioning the $84,000 price for Sovaldi. They specifically asked Martin to "explain how the drug was priced, what discounts are being made available to low-income patients and government health programs, and the potential impact to public health by insurers blocking or delaying access to the medicine because of its cost."

Sofosbuvir is cited as an example of how specialty drugs present both benefits and challenges.

Sofosbuvir also is an excellent example of both the benefit and the challenge of specialty medications. On one hand, this agent offers up to a 95% response rate as part of an interferon-free treatment regimen for hepatitis C.^{6} Generally speaking, it is more effective and better tolerated than alternative treatments.^{6} Unfortunately, the current per pill cost—$1,000—results in an $84,000 treatment course, creating barriers to therapy for many.^{6} Patients, providers, and payors alike have expressed outrage, and the debate has even drawn the attention of the US Congress.^{7} Despite these concerns, sofosbuvir rapidly has become a top seller in the United States. ...

== Global Health Contributions ==
John Martin contributed to expanding global access to HIV and hepatitis treatments by overseeing the development of voluntary licensing agreements that allowed for lower-cost generic production. Under his leadership, Gilead's medications were incorporated into major global health programs like PEPFAR and the Global Fund, increasing availability in low-income countries. He also worked to expand access to hepatitis C treatments through licensing agreements that made them more affordable in developing regions including in highly prevalent countries like Egypt and Republic of Georgia.

== Appointments ==
Martin was president of the International Society for Antiviral Research (1998–2000); chairman of the California Healthcare Institute (2005–2006, 2009); and chairman of BayBio (1999–2001).

Martin has worked with the Federal government of the United States in a number of capacities. Martin served on the council of the National Institute of Allergy and Infectious Diseases (2000–2003). He was part of the Centers for Disease Control and Prevention/Health Resources and Services Administration's Advisory Committee on HIV and STD Prevention and Treatment (2004–2007). He was on the Presidential Advisory Council on HIV/AIDS (2006–2009).

In May 2018, Martin joined the board of directors at The Scripps Research Institute.

== Awards ==
In 1990, Martin received the American Chemical Society's Isbell Award, "for his applications of carbohydrate chemistry to the design of medicinally active nucleosides and nucleotides."

In 2003, Martin received the International Society for Antiviral Research's Gertrude B. Elion Award for Scientific Excellence in 2003. He was also an Award Winner and National Finalist for the EY Entrepreneur of the Year Award.

In 2008 Martin became a member of the National Academy of Engineering, "for the invention, development, and commercialization of anti-viral medicines, especially treatments for HIV/AIDS."

The 2014 Lifetime Achievement Award for Public Service was presented to John Martin by the Institute of Human Virology at the University of Maryland School of Medicine, for his work on the development of anti-HIV medications and on AIDS prevention through Pre-exposure prophylaxis.

In 2015 Martin was named by investment firm Morningstar as best CEO. During his tenure as CEO since 1996, Gilead shares rose 100-fold, and the stock posted a 157% gain just from 2013 to 2015.

In 2017, Martin was chosen to receive the Biotechnology Heritage Award from the Biotechnology Innovation Organization (BIO, formerly the Biotechnology Industry Organization) and the Chemical Heritage Foundation.

In 2019 Martin received the NAS Award for Chemistry in Service to Society for his tireless contributions to human health, including treatments for HIV/AIDS.

== Personal life ==
Martin was divorced. He died on March 30, 2021, at a hospital in Palo Alto, California, from head injuries sustained after a fall.

In April 2021 Forbes ranked Martin to be worth $1.1B.
