= PMPA =

PMPA may refer to:

- Private Motorists Protection Agency, taken over by Axa insurance
- Tenofovir disoproxil, a medication known as PMPA
