= Antiviral Research =

- Discipline: Antiviral drugs
- Language: English
- Edited by: Subhash Vasudevan

Publication details
- History: 1981–present
- Publisher: Elsevier
- Frequency: Monthly
- Impact factor: 7.6 (2022)

Standard abbreviations
- ISO 4: Antivir. Res.
- NLM: Antiviral Res

Indexing
- ISSN: 0166-3542
- OCLC no.: 610588089

Links
- Journal homepage; Online access

Antiviral Research is a monthly peer-reviewed medical journal published by Elsevier covering research on all aspects of the development of drugs, vaccines and immunotherapies against viruses of animals and plants. The journal was established in 1981 and is an official publication of the International Society for Antiviral Research. The editor-in-chief is Subhash Vasudevan.

== Abstracting and indexing ==
Antiviral Research is abstracted and indexed in Abstracts on Hygiene and Communicable Diseases, Elsevier BIOBASE, BIOSIS, Current Contents/Life Sciences, EMBASE, MEDLINE, PASCAL, FRANCIS, Science Citation Index, Scopus, and Tropical Diseases Bulletin. According to the Journal Citation Reports, the journal has a 2022 impact factor of 7.6.
