= Ralf Bartenschlager =

German virologist and university teacher

- Born: 29 May 1958; Mannheim, Germany
- Education: University of Heidelberg
- Scientific career
- Workplaces: University of Heidelberg; University of Mainz

Ralf F. W. Bartenschlager (born 29 May 1958) is a German virologist who has been researching hepatitis C since 1989. He is a professor in the Department of Infectious Diseases at the Heidelberg University.

== Early life ==
Bartenschlager grew up in Mannheim. After high school, he worked as a policemen for four years before starting his undergraduate in biology in 1981 at Heidelberg University. He conduced his thesis work with Heinz Schaller at the ZMBH in Heidelberg on the structure and functional role of the P-protein in Hepatitis B viruses. After graduating in 1990, he continued working as a postdoc at Heidelberg University until joining Hoffmann-La Roche in 1991, where he began working on Hepatitis C.

== Other activities ==
- Robert Koch Institute (RKI), Member of the Scientific Advisory Board
- Wilhelm Sander Foundation, Member of the Scientific Advisory Board

== Recognition ==
Bartenschlager was a recipient of the 2016 Lasker Award for Clinical Research for discoveries related to hepatitis C virus, jointly with Charles M. Rice and Michael J. Sofia. Bartenschlager received in 2021 the Beijerinck Virology Prize.
