= Katherine Seley-Radtke =

American medicinal chemist

Katherine Seley-Radtke is an American medicinal chemist who specializes in the discovery and design of novel nucleoside or nucleotide based enzyme inhibitors that may be used to treat infections or cancer. She has authored over 90 peer-reviewed publications, is an inventor of five issued US patents, and is a professor in the department of chemistry and biochemistry at the University of Maryland, Baltimore County. Her international impact includes scientific collaborations, policy advising and diplomatic appointments in biosecurity efforts.

== Scientific contributions ==
A pioneer of the "fleximer" class of nucleoside analogs, Seley-Radtke has designed, synthesized and developed a broad range of enzyme inhibitors that have applications as potential therapeutics in treatment of cancer and of infections with viruses. parasites and bacteria. Her lab has identified a series of flexible acyclic nucleosides with prodrug forms which demonstrate activity against coronaviruses, including SARS and MERS, the first known nucleoside analog inhibitors of these viruses. The flexibility of these inhibitors enables binding of the active site as well as amino acid residues outside of the active site which is believed to help reduce emergence of resistance.

A leader in nucleoside chemistry and in the application of nucleoside analogs to therapeutics, Seley-Radtke has been active in the International Society for Antiviral Research (ISAR), and has organized and chaired a number of Gordon Research Conferences. In addition, she actively reviews grant applications for the NIH and has served as co-chair for NIH study sections. She is serving as President-elect, International Society for Antiviral Research (ISAR), has co-chaired two Gordon Research Conferences. Seley-Radtke actively reviews grants for the NIH.

Widely published herself (see "Representative Publications" below), Seley-Radtke is a peer-reviewer for manuscripts submitted for over 60 different scientific publications. She has been an Associate Editor of Antiviral Chemistry & Chemotherapy since 2016 and has served on the editorial boards of Current Protocols in Chemical Biology (Associate Editor); Research and Reports in Medicinal Chemistry (Editorial Board, 2011–2013); Clinical Medicine Insights, and Therapeutics (Editorial Board).

== Education ==
Growing up in Erie, PA, Seley-Radtke pursued science from an early age. Her high school education included a combined program at Gannon University where she carried out a mouse breeding experiment involving over 200 mice in her family home. She graduated from high school at the age of 15. She enrolled in college at Penn State, but only attended college part-time when she married at 18, moved and had two children. She returned to college full-time when her daughters reached junior high, and completed her BA with honors from the University of South Florida in 1992. By then her scientific interests were focused on chemistry and she pursued her PhD in the laboratory of Stewart Schneller, first at USF and then at Auburn University.

== International and diplomatic activities ==
Seley-Radtke has been actively involved in diplomatic efforts between Russia and the US Departments of Health and Human Services and Defense to reduce proliferation threats through scientific collaboration. She served as a Jefferson Fellow of the National Academy of Sciences with a specific assignment in the Office of Cooperative Threat Reduction. Much of her diplomatic work involves addressing scientific issues such as emerging infectious disease threats with Russian leaders. She has worked for the US Dept. of State as a Senior Science advisor, and has served as an advisor on the HHS/DoD Cooperative Threat Reduction (CTR) Program with Russia, Smallpox projects, 2001–2009.

An active leader of international science communities, Seley-Radtke has held various positions on the board of the International Society of Antiviral Research (ISAR) where she is the president elect for 2020–2022. She is also the elected Secretary for the International Society of Nucleosides, Nucleotides & Nucleic Acids (IS3NA), 2019–2023.

== Awards and honors ==
Seley-Radtke has won awards for her teaching and mentoring and her research has established her as an international expert in antiviral chemotherapy. Her work has been recognized with the following awards and honors:

- 2020 International Society for Antiviral Research (ISAR) Antonín Holý Memorial Award
- 2017 USM Regents’ Faculty Award for Excellence in Research
- 2016 Maryland Chemist of the Year, American Chemical Society
- 2015–2018 UMBC Presidential Research Professor
- 2015 Outstanding Chemistry Alumni Award, University of South Florida
- 2011 Outstanding Faculty Member of the Year, UMBC Honors College students
- 2008–2010 Inaugural Faculty Fellow, UMBC Honors College Program
- 2006 NAS Jefferson Science Fellow, U.S. Department of State
- 2006 Distinguished Faculty Award, The National Society of Collegiate Scholars
- 2003 ACS PROGRESS Lectureship in Chemical Sciences Award
- 2002 "Class Of 1940 W. Howard Ector Outstanding Teacher" Georgia Institute of Technology ($10,000 prize)
- 1998 Outstanding Faculty Award, Cardinal Key Honor Society, Auburn University
- 1997 Sigma Xi Outstanding Dissertation, Auburn University
- 1997 Carolyn Taylor Carr Award, Auburn University

== Publications ==
Seley-Radtke has authored over 90 peer-reviewed publications which have been cited over 1600 times, with an h-index of 22. She is also the inventor on five issued US Patents. Here are some representative publications:

1. Seley-Radtke K. Discovery, Design, Synthesis, and Application of Nucleoside/Nucleotides. Molecules. 2020;25(7):1526. Published 2020 Mar 27.10.3390/molecules25071526
2. Yates MK, Chatterjee P, Flint M, et al. Probing the Effects of Pyrimidine Functional Group Switches on Acyclic Fleximer Analogues for Antiviral Activity. Molecules. 2019;24(17):3184. Published 2019 Sep 2.
3. Ku T, Lopresti N, Shirley M, et al. Synthesis of distal and proximal fleximer base analogues and evaluation in the nucleocapsid protein of HIV-1. Bioorg Med Chem. 2019;27(13):2883–92.
4. Seley-Radtke K, Deval J. Advances in antiviral nucleoside analogues and their prodrugs. Antivir Chem Chemother. 2018 Jan–Dec;26:2040206618781410. doi: 10.1177/2040206618781410. PMID 29890841
5. Seley-Radtke, Katherine (2018). "Flexibility-Not just for yoga anymore!". Antiviral Chemistry & Chemotherapy. 26:1–12.
6. Temburnikar K, Seley-Radtke KL. Recent advances in synthetic approaches for medicinal chemistry of C-nucleosides. Beilstein J Org Chem. 2018 Apr 5;14:772–85.
7. Khandazhinskaya AL, Alexandrova LA, Matyugina ES, Solyev PN, Efremenkova OV, Buckheit KW, Wilkinson M, Buckheit RW Jr, Chernousova LN, Smirnova TG, Andreevskaya SN, Leonova OG, Popenko VI, Kochetkov SN, Seley-Radtke KL. Molecules. Novel 5'-Norcarbocyclic Pyrimidine Derivatives as Antibacterial Agents.2018 Nov 23;23(12):3069.
8. Cawrse BM, Lapidus RS, Cooper B, Choi EY, Seley-Radtke KL. Anticancer Properties of Halogenated Pyrrolo[3,2-d]pyrimidines with Decreased Toxicity via N5 Substitution. ChemMedChem. 2018;13(2):178–85.
9. Geisman AN, Valuev-Elliston VT, Ozerov AA, et al. 1,6-Bis[(benzyloxy)methyl]uracil derivatives-Novel antivirals with activity against HIV-1 and influenza H1N1 virus. Bioorg Med Chem. 2016;24(11):2476–85.
10. Chen Z, Jochmans D, Ku T, Paeshuyse J, Neyts J, Seley-Radtke KL. Bicyclic and Tricyclic "Expanded" Nucleobase Analogues of Sofosbuvir: New Scaffolds for Hepatitis C Therapies. ACS Infect Dis. 2015;1(8):357–66.
11. Chen Z, Ku TC, Seley-Radtke KL. Thiophene-expanded guanosine analogues of Gemcitabine. Bioorg Med Chem Lett. 2015;25(19):4274–76.
12. Babkov DA, Valuev-Elliston VT, Paramonova MP, et al. Scaffold hopping: exploration of acetanilide-containing uracil analogues as potential NNRTIs. Bioorg Med Chem. 2015;23(5):1069–81.
13. Seley-Radtke KL, Sunkara NK. Carbocyclic thymidine analogues for use as potential therapeutic agents. Nucleosides Nucleotides Nucleic Acids. 2009;28(5):633–41.
14. O'Daniel PI, Jefferson M, Wiest O, Seley-Radtke KL. A computational study of expanded heterocyclic nucleosides in DNA. J Biomol Struct Dyn. 2008;26(3):283–92.
15. Katherine L Seley, Liang Zhang, Asmerom Hagos, and Stephen Quirk. Fleximers: design and synthesis of a new class of novel shape-modified nucleosides. Journal of Organic Chemistry, 2002 67 (10), 3365–73.
