= Amalka Supercomputing facility =

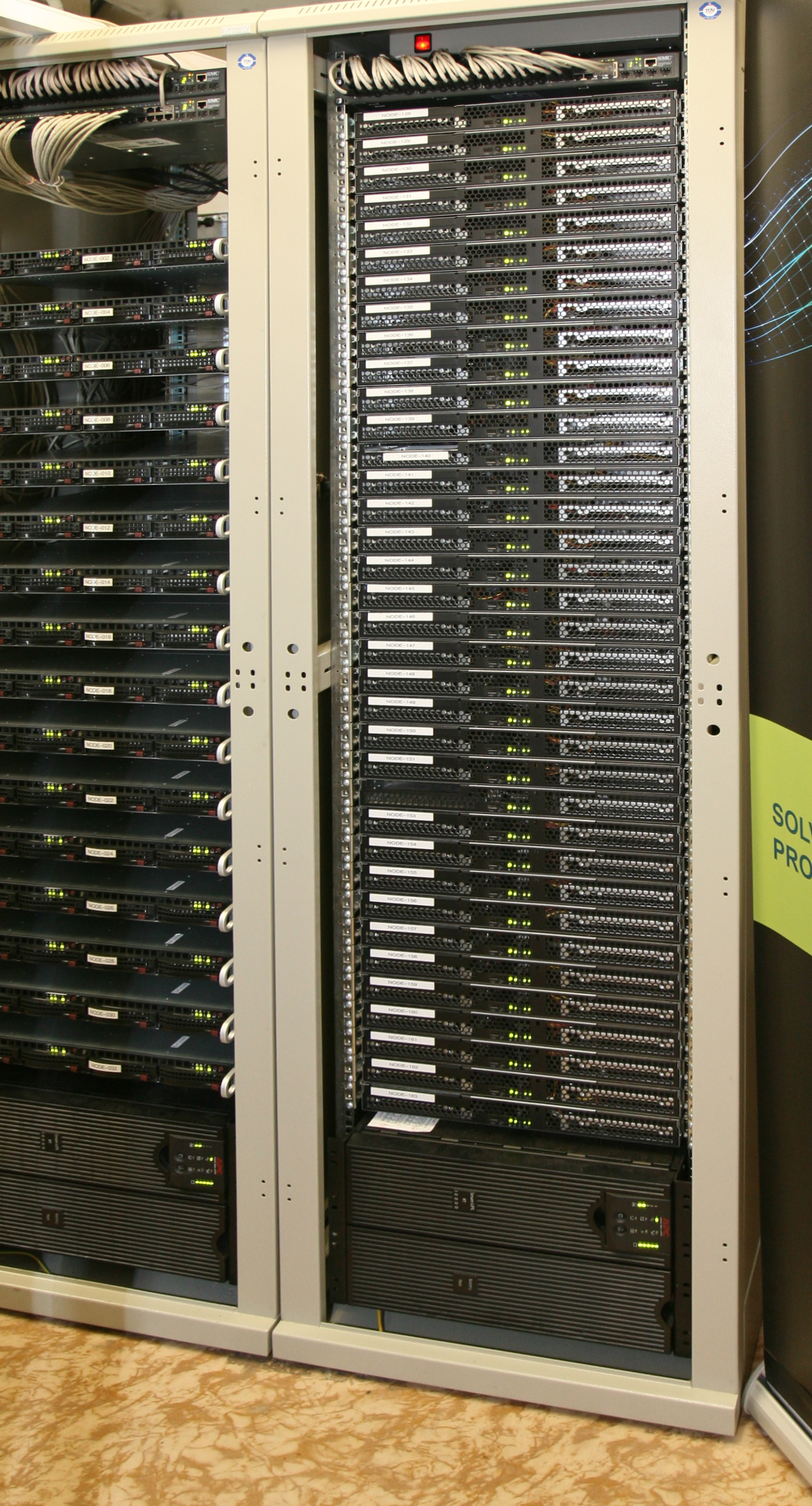
6th generation of Amalka Supercomputing facility

The Amalka Supercomputing facility is the largest of the three Czech parallel supercomputers. It is used by Department of Space Physics, Institute of Atmospheric Physics, Academy of Sciences of the Czech Republic.

The primary task is computation and visualisation in the area of space research for the European Space Agency or NASA, such as a preparation of Demeter (satellite) launch.

Amalka Supercomputing facility is credited with computing the first kinetic magnetic field model of Mercury in the MESSENGER project. It also helped to understand the results from the Cluster II mission.

At present, the facility is supporting the THEMIS (Time History of Events and Macroscale Interactions during Substorms) project. The results will be useful in planning for creating permanent human bases on Moon that will be protected from solar wind.

The current version runs Linux slackware and delivers 6.38 TFlops. Expansion and optimization of the infrastructure is being implemented by Sprinx Systems.

Generation	Year	Processing Rate	# of Computers	# of CPUs	# of Cores	Other parameters
1	1998	units of MFlops	8	8	8	
2	2000	tens of GFlops	16	16	16	
3	2003	around 1 TFlop	96	188	188	
4	2006	2,6 TFlops	138	272	360	180 GB RAM, 20 TB HDD, 40 kW
5	2007	4,07 TFlops		326	572	
6	2009	6,38 TFlops		356	800	
