= Masanori Baba =

Japanese professor of microbiology

Masanori Baba (馬場 昌範, Baba Masanori) is a Japanese professor of microbiology who works at the Kagoshima University in Kagoshima, Japan. On May 20, 2013, he was awarded the Gertrude B. Elion Memorial Award by the International Society for Antiviral Research for his research into anti-AIDS drugs.
