= Michael J. Sofia =

- Education: Cornell University; University of Illinois
- Scientific career
- Workplaces: Arbutus Biopharma; Gilead Sciences; Drexel University School of Medicine

External videos
- “Acceptance Remarks, 2016 Lasker Awards Ceremony”, Lasker Foundation, 2016.

Michael J. Sofia is a chemist whose main research focus is hepatitis C virus and hepatitis B virus drug discovery. He was a co-recipient of the Lasker-DeBakey Clinical Medical Research Award for his work on hepatitis C in 2016 and of the Gertrude B. Elion Memorial Award from the International Society for Antiviral Research in 2017.

== Career ==
Sofia earned a bachelor's degree in chemistry from Cornell University, and Ph.D. in organic chemistry from the University of Illinois Urbana-Champaign. He did a postdoctoral fellow at Columbia University, followed by work as a research scientist at biotech companies including the Squibb Institute for Medical Research. Eli Lilly and Company, and Bristol-Myers Squibb. He was Senior Vice President of Chemistry at Pharmasset from 2005 to 2012 when Pharmasset was acquired by Gilead, after which he became a senior advisor.

Michael J. Sofia is currently the Chief Scientific Officer and co-founder of Arbutus Biopharma, formerly as OnCore Biopharma prior to its 2015 merger with Tekmira Pharmaceuticals.

== Awards ==
Michael J. Sofia was awarded the 2016 Lasker-DeBakey Clinical Medical Research Award for his research on hepatitis C, along with Charles M. Rice and Ralf F. W. Bartenschlager. He was also awarded the 2016 IUPAC-Richter Prize in Medicinal Chemistry and the Economist's 2015 Innovation Award in the Bioscience category for the development of sofosbuvir, which was named after Sofia for his contributions to the discovery and development of the drug. He received the Gertrude B. Elion Memorial Award of the International Society for Antiviral Research (2017).
