= Czech Academy of Sciences =

Academy of sciences

- Akademie věd České republiky

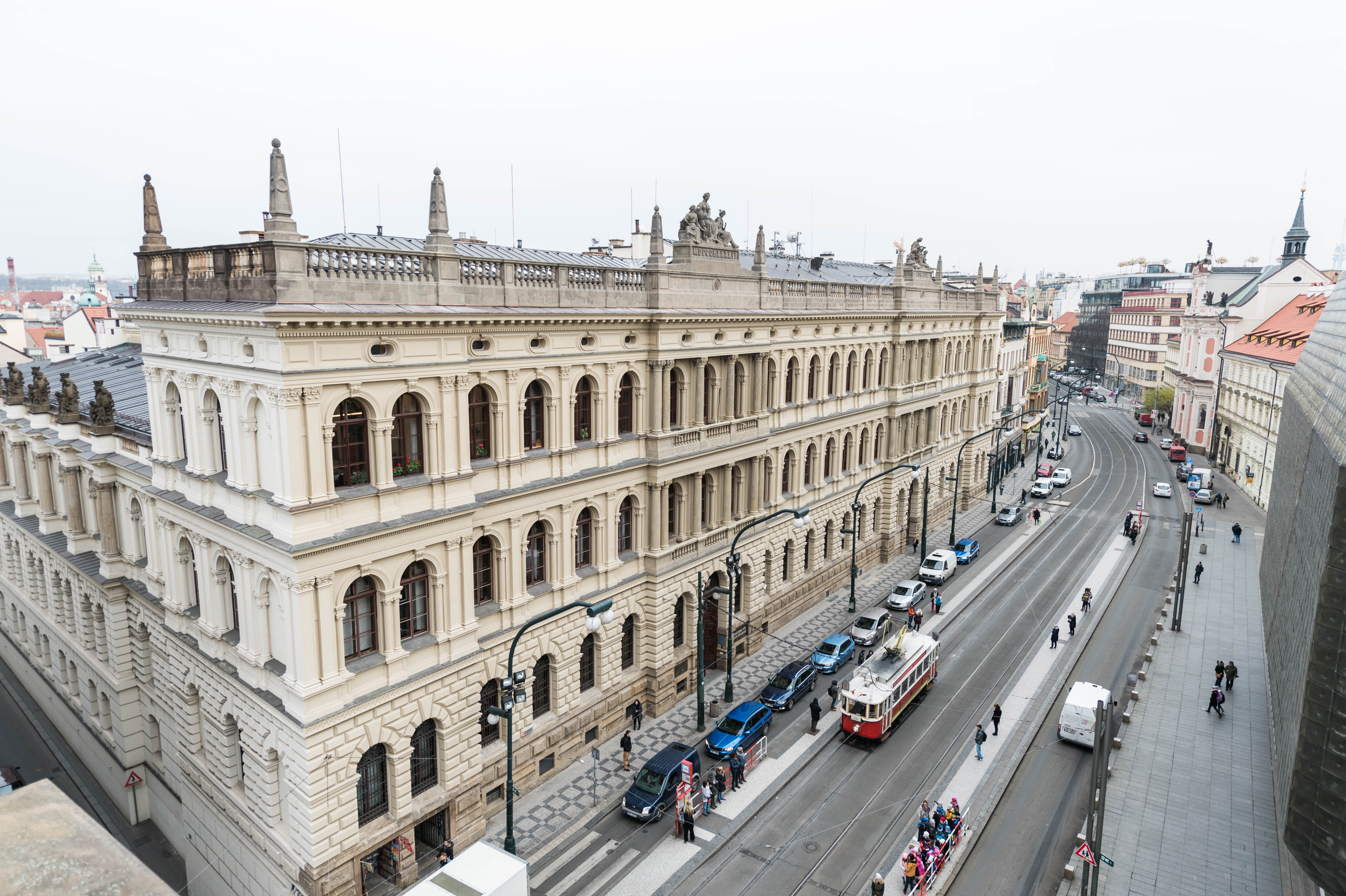
- Headquarters in Prague
- Abbreviation: CAS; AV ČR
- Predecessor: Czechoslovak Academy of Sciences
- Formation: 1992; 34 years ago
- Type: Public research organisation
- Headquarters: Prague, Czech Republic
- President: Radomír Pánek
- Staff: 9,937 FTE (2025)
- Students: 2,041 doctoral students (2025)
- Website: www.avcr.cz/en/

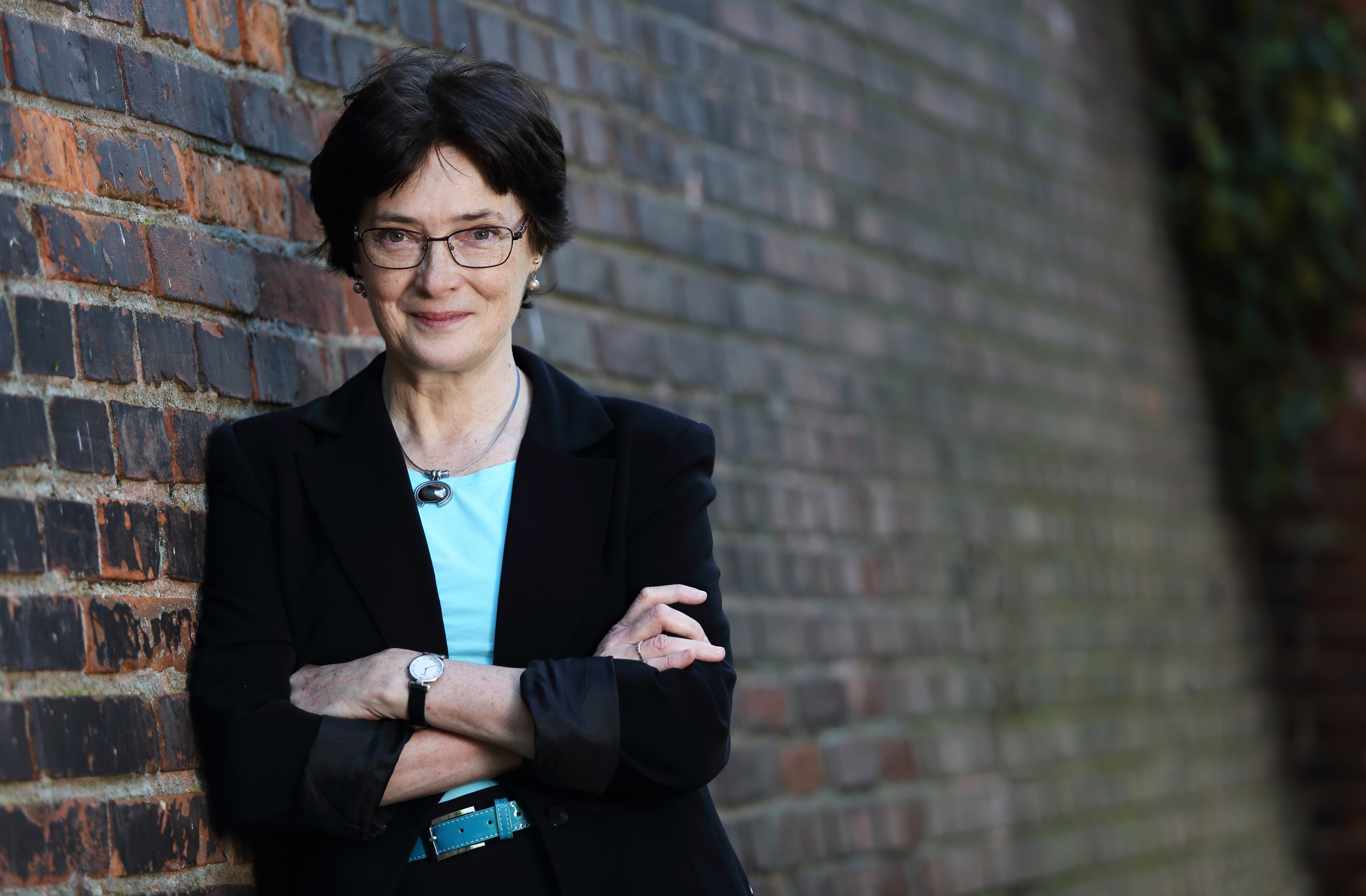
Eva Zažímalová, former president of the Czech Academy of Sciences

The Czech Academy of Sciences (abbr. CAS, Czech: Akademie věd České republiky, abbr. AV ČR) is a non-university public research organisation headquartered in Prague, Czech Republic. Its institutes conduct basic and applied research in the natural and technical sciences, social sciences and humanities. They also provide doctoral training in cooperation with universities.

As of 2026, the Academy comprises 52 research institutes and two supporting institutions: the Academy Library and the Centre of Administration and Operations. Its research is organised into three broad areas: mathematics, physics and earth sciences; life and chemical sciences; and humanities and social sciences.

The Academy was established in 1992 as the Czech successor to the Czechoslovak Academy of Sciences.

== History ==
The Academy’s predecessors are the Royal Bohemian Society of Sciences (1784) and the Czech Academy of Sciences and Arts (1890). The Czechoslovak Academy of Sciences was established in 1952, bringing together the two societies and other research institutions. Otto Wichterle became president in 1990 and in his two years in office, he began reorganising the Academy. The Czech Academy of Sciences began work on 31 December 1992, replacing the Czechoslovak Academy of Sciences.

Between 1993 and 1996, the Academy adopted new statutes and introduced independent evaluation of its institutes. Budget cuts also forced it to close institutes and reduce staff numbers.

In 2007, the Academy’s institutes were converted from state contributory organisations into public research institutions. According to Academy president Václav Pačes, the institutes gained more independence and greater responsibility. They could manage their own property and enter into joint ventures.

In 2009, proposed reductions in funding prompted protests from researchers. In July 2009, Prime Minister Jan Fischer agreed with Academy president Jiří Drahoš to provide about CZK 500 million more for 2010 than the government had originally proposed.

== Research ==
At the Institute of Organic Chemistry and Biochemistry, Antonín Holý worked with virologist Erik De Clercq at KU Leuven to discover antiviral compounds cidofovir, adefovir and tenofovir. Their partnership dated back to 1976, during the Czechoslovak Academy of Sciences era. Gilead Sciences developed the compounds into medicines. Tenofovir became widely used to treat HIV infection and hepatitis B, and to prevent HIV infection.

Researchers at the Institute of Physics worked with colleagues in Mainz on the theory of altermagnetism. This form of magnetic order differs from both ferromagnetism and antiferromagnetism. Their theoretical work was followed in 2024 by experimental evidence from an international team that included Academy researchers. Experiments on manganese telluride showed that electrons with different spins could have different energies even though the material had no net magnetisation.

The Institute of Experimental Botany contributed to the international effort to produce a reference genome for bread wheat, published in 2018. The institute’s Olomouc team developed methods to separate individual chromosomes, supplied their DNA to partner laboratories and helped sequence several chromosomes. Researchers can use the genome map to find genes that affect wheat yields, grain quality and the plant’s ability to withstand disease and drought.

== Institutes of the Czech Academy of Sciences ==
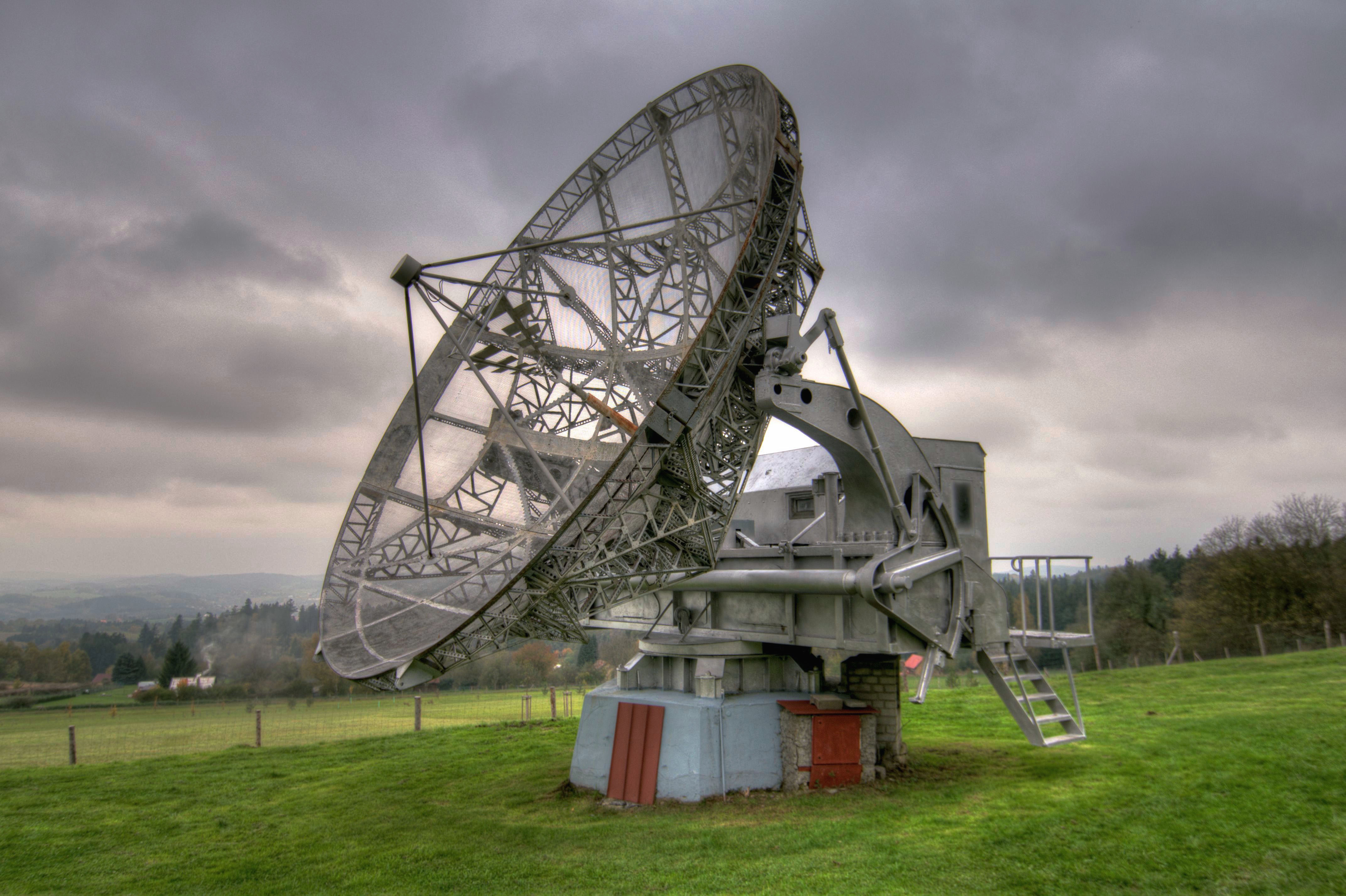
A radio telescope of the Astronomical Institute in Ondřejov

The Academy’s 52 research institutes are organised into three research areas, each divided into three sections. An institute is divided further into departments, laboratories, or working teams, depending on the size and the topic of the institute.

=== Mathematics, Physics and Earth Sciences ===
==== Mathematics, Physics and Computer Science ====
- Astronomical Institute
- Institute of Physics
- Institute of Mathematics
- Institute of Computer Science
- Nuclear Physics Institute
- Institute of Information Theory and Automation

==== Applied Physics ====
- Institute of Photonics and Electronics
- Institute of Physics of Materials
- Institute of Plasma Physics
- Institute of Scientific Instruments
- Institute of Theoretical and Applied Mechanics
- Institute of Thermomechanics

==== Earth Sciences ====
- Institute of Geophysics
- Institute of Geology
- Institute of Atmospheric Physics
- Institute of Geonics
- Institute of Hydrology
- Institute of Rock Structure and Mechanics

=== Life and Chemical Sciences ===
==== Chemical Sciences ====
- Institute of Analytical Chemistry
- Institute of Inorganic Chemistry
- Heyrovský Institute
- Institute of Chemical Process Fundamentals
- Institute of Macromolecular Chemistry
- Institute of Organic Chemistry and Biochemistry

==== Biological and Medical Sciences ====
- Institute of Biophysics
- Institute of Biotechnology
- Institute of Physiology
- Institute of Microbiology
- Institute of Experimental Botany
- Institute of Experimental Medicine
- Institute of Molecular Genetics
- Institute of Animal Physiology and Genetics

==== Bio-Ecological Sciences ====
- Biology Centre
- Institute of Botany
- Institute of Vertebrate Biology
- Global Change Research Institute (CzechGlobe)

=== Humanities and Social Sciences ===
==== Social and Economic Sciences ====
- Economics Institute, which forms CERGE-EI jointly with the Center for Economic Research and Graduate Education of Charles University
- Institute of Psychology
- Institute of Sociology
- Institute of State and Law

==== Historical Sciences ====
- Institute of Archaeology (Brno)
- Institute of Archaeology (Prague)
- Institute of History
- Masaryk Institute and Archives
- Institute of Art History
- Institute of Contemporary History

==== Humanities and Philology ====
- Institute of Ethnology
- Institute of Philosophy
- Oriental Institute
- Institute of Slavonic Studies
- Institute of Czech Literature
- Czech Language Institute

=== Supporting institutions ===
- Library of the Czech Academy of Sciences
- Centre of Administration and Operations

== See also ==
- Amalka Supercomputing facility

== Literature ==
- Franc, Martin; Mádlová, Vlasta (2014). The History of the Czech Academy of Sciences in Pictures / Dějiny Akademie věd v obrazech (in English and Czech). Prague: Academia. ISBN 9788020023407.
