= Recherche et Industrie Thérapeutiques =

Belgian company

- Founded: 1945; 80 years ago in Genval, Belgium
- Founder: Pieter De Somer
- Fate: Merged with Glaxo and SmithKline to form GlaxoSmithKline
- Key people: Roger Connor, CEO

Recherche et Industrie Thérapeutiques (R.I.T.) was founded in Genval, Belgium, as a penicillin factory in 1945 by Dr Pieter De Somer, who later became the founder of the Rega Institute for Medical Research and rector of the Katholieke Universiteit Leuven (Leuven, Belgium). The industrialist Jean Lannoye provided the funding for the company. The company started its vaccine research and production in the 1950s. The present CEO of the company is Roger Connor.

In 1968, the company was acquired by Smith, Kline & French and the name was changed to SmithKline-RIT. In 1989, it became SmithKline Beecham Biologicals, and since 2000 GlaxoSmithKline Biologicals.

== History ==
In 1945, the company was founded under the name of R.I.T. in Genval. In 1956, they began the production of vaccines for (polio vaccine). In 1958, the company acquired a site in Rixensart. In 1968, R.I.T. became a subsidiary company of SmithKline Corp. In 1989, there was a merger between SmithKline and Beecham.

In 1992, R.I.T. acquired SSW-Dresden in Germany. 1995 saw the extension of the site in Rixensart towards two new sites in Belgium: Wavre for production and Gembloux for scaling-up. In 1995, an agreement was made on a joint venture in China. A joint venture in Russia followed in 1997.

In 2000, there was a merger between GlaxoWellcome and SmithKlineBeecham to form GlaxoSmithKline.

== See also ==
- MMR vaccine
- Rega Institute for Medical Research
