= Antonín Holý =

Czech chemist (1936–2012)

- Holý in 2007
- Born: September 1, 1936; Prague, Czechoslovakia
- Died: July 16, 2012 (aged 75); Prague, Czech Republic
- Education: Charles University in Prague
- Known for: Antiretroviral drugs used in the treatment of HIV
- Spouse: Ludmila Holá
- Scientific career
- Fields: Chemist
- Workplaces: Czechoslovak Academy of Sciences (1960 – 1992); Academy of Sciences of the Czech Republic (1992 – 2002)
- Doctoral students: Michal Hocek

Antonín Holý (1 September 1936 – 16 July 2012) was a Czech medicinal chemist known for his research on acyclic nucleoside phosphonates (ANPs), an important class of antiviral nucleotide analogues. He spent most of his scientific career at the Institute of Organic Chemistry and Biochemistry in Prague, where he served as director from 1994 to 2002. In a long-term collaboration with virologist Erik De Clercq, Holý synthesized antiviral compounds including Cidofovir, Adefovir and Tenofovir.

These compounds were subsequently developed into medicines used against Cytomegalovirus infections, Hepatitis B and HIV/AIDS. Tenofovir also became a component of combination therapies used for both HIV treatment and prevention. Holý's work has been credited with improving or extending the lives of millions of people with viral diseases worldwide. Over his career, he co-authored around 600 scientific publications and held more than 60 patents.

== Scientific career ==
Born in Prague, Czechoslovakia, Antonín Holý studied organic chemistry from 1954 to 1959 at the Faculty of Mathematics and Physics of Charles University in Prague. From 1960 he joined the Institute of Organic Chemistry and Biochemistry (IOCB) of the Czechoslovak Academy of Sciences in Prague and had been a researcher there since 1963. He became the institute's lead scientist in 1967, and from 1983 headed its nucleic acids chemistry group. In 1987 he became head of the Bioorganic Chemistry Department and from 1994 to 2002 he was head of the IOCB.

Since 1976 he had collaborated on the development of new antiretroviral drugs with Erik De Clercq of the Rega Institute for Medical Research at the Catholic University of Leuven, Belgium.

His key contribution is the synthesis of nucleotide analogues, synthetic mimetics of the building blocks of RNA and DNA, that have found utility as inhibitors of viral replication. Clinically important compounds included Tenofovir, Adefovir and Cidofovir, which were subsequently developed into antiviral medicines.

Tenofovir became an important component of combination therapies for HIV treatment and, in combination with Emtricitabine, of Pre-exposure prophylaxis (PrEP) for HIV prevention.

In 2006, IOCB and Gilead Sciences launched the Gilead Sciences Research Centre, a five-year research partnership supporting work on human diseases at the institute. Under the agreement, Gilead provided $1.1 million annually for five years to support the research programme.

Several antiviral drugs developed from this research were later approved for clinical use. Cidofovir (Vistide) was approved in the United States in 1996 for Cytomegalovirus retinitis, followed by Tenofovir disoproxil (Viread) for HIV-1 infection in 2001 and Adefovir dipivoxil (Hepsera) for chronic hepatitis B in 2002. In 2004, Emtricitabine and tenofovir disoproxil fumarate were combined as Truvada, which was approved for the treatment of HIV-1 infection.

== Death ==
Holý retired on 1 September 2011, his 75th birthday, and died in Prague on 16 July 2012 following a long illness. On the same day, the U.S. Food and Drug Administration approved Truvada for pre-exposure prophylaxis (PrEP) to reduce the risk of HIV infection.

== Awards and honours ==
- 1984 State Prize for Chemistry (Acyklická analoga nukleosidů a nukleotidů)
- 1998 Honor plaque: Nucleic Acids Chemistry journal
- 1999 Hanuš's Medal of the Czech Chemical Society; Honorary doctorate of the Palacký University in Olomouc
- 2001 Descartes Prize of the European Union; The Medal of Merit of the Czech Republic (Za zásluhy) I. degree
- 2002 Elion Award of International Society for Antiviral Research; State Medal "Pour merit"
- 2003 Honorary membership in the Rega Institute for Medical Research, Catholic University of Leuven, Belgium.
- 2004 Award Praemium Bohemiae; Medal of the Czech Academy of Sciences: De scientia et humanitate optime meritis
- 2005 Honorary doctorate of the Ghent University (Belgium); The Medal of Merit of the Faculty of Science at the Charles University in Prague.
- 2006 Member of the European Academy of Sciences and Arts (Salzburg)
- 2006 Honorary doctorate of the Institute of Chemical Technology in Prague
- 2007 State Prize "Czech Head" (Česká hlava)
- 2008 Honorary Professorship at the School of Chemistry, University of Manchester
- 2009 Honorary doctorate of the University of South Bohemia in České Budějovice
- 2011 Silver memorial medal of the Senate of the Parliament of the Czech Republic
- 2012 Silver medal of the City of Prague

== See also ==
- Adefovir
- Cidofovir
- Tenofovir
