= Efavirenz/emtricitabine/tenofovir =

Combination drug for HIV

Efavirenz/emtricitabine/tenofovir disoproxil

Combination of
- Efavirenz: non-nucleoside reverse transcriptase inhibitor
- Emtricitabine: nucleoside analog reverse transcriptase inhibitor
- Tenofovir disoproxil: nucleotide analog reverse transcriptase inhibitor

Clinical data
- Trade names: Atripla, Viraday, others
- Other names: tenofovir disoproxil fumarate/emtricitabine/efavirenz
- AHFS/Drugs.com: Professional Drug Facts
- License data: US DailyMed: Atripla
- Pregnancy category: AU: D
- Routes of administration: By mouth
- ATC code: J05AR06 (WHO)

Legal status
- Legal status: AU: S4 (Prescription only); UK: POM (Prescription only); US: ℞-only; EU: Rx-only; In general: ℞ (Prescription only)

Identifiers
- CAS Number: 731772-50-2
- ChemSpider: none
- KEGG: D10851

Efavirenz/emtricitabine/tenofovir (EFV/FTC/TDF), sold under the brand name Atripla among others, is a fixed-dose combination antiretroviral medication used to treat HIV/AIDS. It contains efavirenz, emtricitabine, and tenofovir disoproxil. It can be used by itself or together with other antiretroviral medications. It is taken by mouth.

Common side effects include headache, trouble sleeping, sleepiness, and unsteadiness. Serious side effects may include high blood lactate levels, psychiatric symptoms, and enlargement of the liver. It should not be used in children. If used during the first trimester of pregnancy harm to the baby may occur.

Efavirenz/emtricitabine/tenofovir was approved for medical use in the United States in 2006, and in the European Union in 2007. It is on the World Health Organization's List of Essential Medicines. Efavirenz/emtricitabine/tenofovir is available as a generic medication.

== Medical uses ==
Efavirenz/emtricitabine/tenofovir is indicated for the treatment of HIV/AIDS.

== Contraindications ==
People who have shown strong hypersensitivity to efavirenz, should not take efavirenz/emtricitabine/tenofovir. Drugs that are contraindicated are: voriconazole, ergot derivative drugs, benzodiazepines midazolam and triazolam, calcium channel blocker bepridil, cisapride, pimozide and St. John's wort (Hypericum perforatum). Breastfeeding is also contraindicated.

== Side effects ==
Common side effects of efavirenz/emtricitabine/tenofovir are tiredness, dizziness, gastrointestinal distress, and skin discoloration. More severe side effects are hallucinations, sleeplessness and depression.

Recommended dosage for efavirenz/emtricitabine/tenofovir is one tablet at or before bedtime. Side effects can be reduced if it is taken on an empty stomach. People with kidney or liver problems can take one tablet by mouth once a day. However, people whose CrCl levels are less than 50ml/min should not follow this dosage. Instead, patients should be prescribed drug components of the fixed-dose combinations while adjusting TDF and FTC doses according to the patient's CrCl levels.

== Interactions ==
Medications that should not be taken with efavirenz/emtricitabine/tenofovir include bepridil, midazolam, pimozide, triazolam, or ergot derivatives. Additionally, St. John's wort is known to reduce the effectiveness of efavirenz/emtricitabine/tenofovir, resulting in increased viral load and possible resistance to efavirenz/emtricitabine/tenofovir.

== Mechanism of action ==
Efavirenz is a non-nucleoside reverse transcriptase inhibitor (NNRTI) of HIV-1. Emtricitabine is a nucleoside reverse transcriptase inhibitor (NRTI) of HIV-1. Tenofovir is a nucleotide reverse transcriptase inhibitor of HIV-1, and it can be classified as an NtRTI. These three drugs work in combination to target the HIV reverse transcriptase protein in three ways, which reduces the virus's capacity to mutate.

In combination studies there were synergistic antiviral effects observed between emtricitabine and efavirenz, efavirenz and tenofovir, and emtricitabine and tenofovir.

== History ==
Efavirenz/emtricitabine/tenofovir was approved in the United States to treat HIV in 2006. The main advantage of the new drug was that it could be taken once daily and reduce the overall stress in an antiretroviral regimen. An equivalent two pill regimen is available in developing countries at a price of about US$1.00 per day, as Gilead Sciences has licensed the patents covering emtricitabine/tenofovir to the Medicines Patent Pool and Merck and Co makes efavirenz available in developing countries at a reduced price.

== Society and culture ==
It is the first multi-class antiretroviral drug available in the United States and represents the first collaboration between two U.S. pharmaceutical companies to combine their patented anti-HIV drugs into one product.

In much of the developing world marketing and distribution is handled by Merck & Co.
