= John Secrist =

American chemist

John A. Secrist III is an American chemist, whose work invented Clofarabine, currently at Southern Research and an Elected Fellow of the American Association for the Advancement of Science.
