= William Prusoff =

American pharmacologist (1920–2011)

William Herman Prusoff
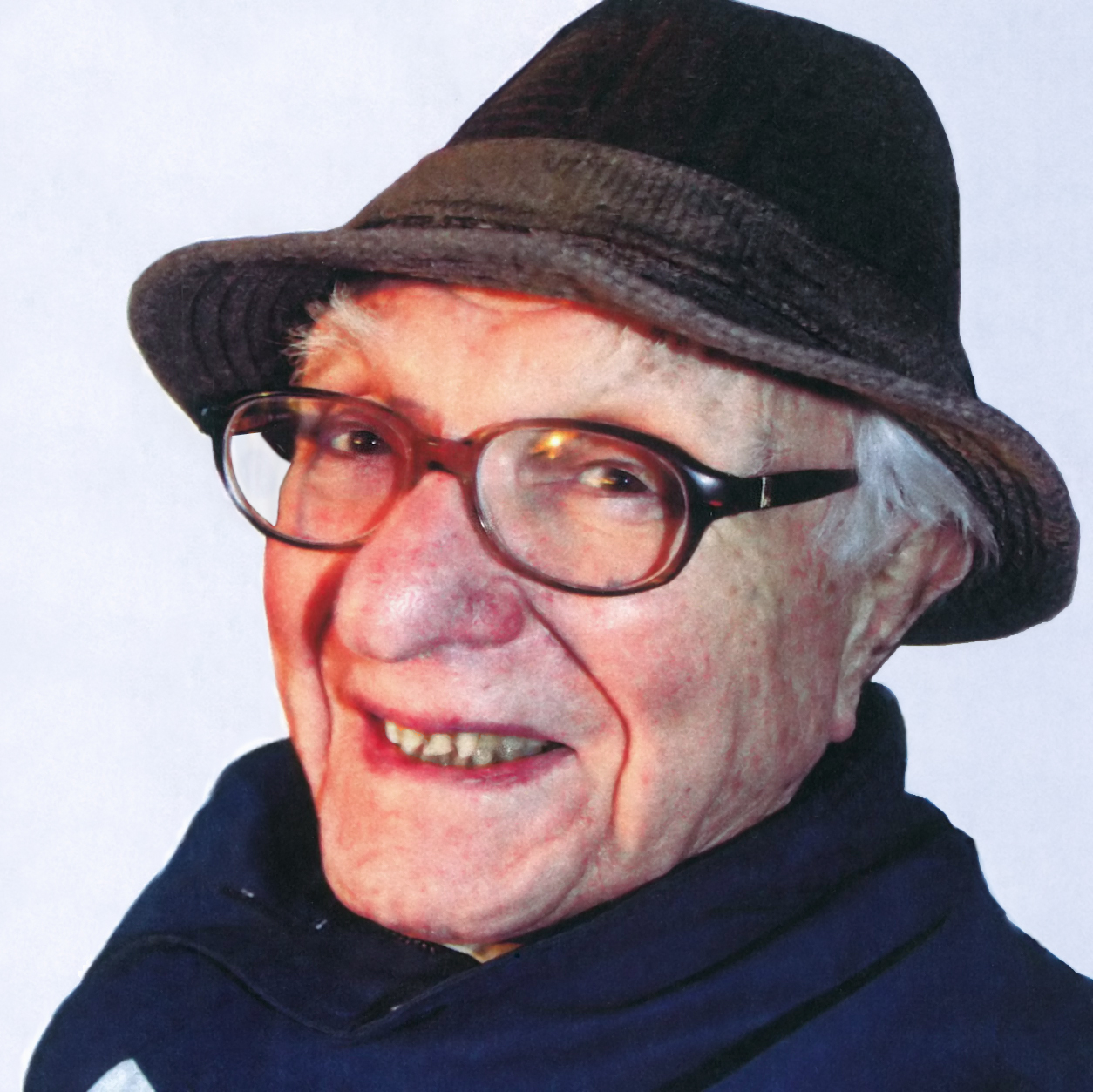
- Born: June 25, 1920; Brooklyn, New York, U.S.
- Died: April 3, 2011 (aged 90); New Haven, Connecticut, U.S.
- Education: University of Miami; Columbia University
- Spouse: Brigitte Prusoff (née Auerbach) (1926-1991)
- Children: 2
- Scientific career
- Fields: Pharmacology, virology
- Workplaces: Case Western Reserve; William H. Prusoff Foundation; Yale University

William Herman Prusoff (June 25, 1920 – April 3, 2011) was an American pharmacologist who was an early innovator in antiviral drugs, developing idoxuridine, the first antiviral agent approved by the FDA, in the 1950s, and co-developing (with Tai-shun Lin) stavudine, one of the earliest AIDS drugs, in the mid-1980s.

== Scientific career ==
William Prusoff attended the University of Miami. After receiving his undergraduate degree in chemistry, he obtained his PhD from Columbia University and later completed his postdoctoral training in the laboratory of professor Arnold Welch at Case Western Reserve University. After Welch was recruited by Yale to head the Medical School's pharmacology department, Prusoff was invited to join the same department as an assistant professor and was subsequently promoted to the rank of professor. This relationship at Yale would span over the next 58 years, with William Prusoff becoming one of Yale's most well respected scientists and teachers.

Prusoff spent most of his career studying analogs of thymidine, a nucleoside building block of DNA, with an eye toward developing therapeutic agents. By exploring analogs to thymidine for use as antiviral drugs, his research created a new scientific paradigm for antiviral drug development.

In the late 1950s, William Prusoff synthesized one of the first thymidine analogs, 5-iododeoxyuridine. At the time, it was thought to be difficult to find antiviral drugs with a high therapeutic index, but professor Herbert E. Kaufman found that the compound could be used as an effective topical treatment for herpesvirus keratitis by disrupting the virus's ability to reproduce. More significantly, though, this discovery was a scientific game changer – it was the first time that a clinical antiviral drug had been shown to have selective antiviral activity if used properly. In the 1970s, Prusoff coformulated the Cheng–Prusoff equation to calculate the absolute inhibition constant K_{i} (IC_{50}).

In the 1980s, while the AIDS epidemic was spreading and found to be caused by HIV, William Prusoff and the late Dr. Tai-Shun Lin discovered that a compound synthesized by dr. Jerome Horwitz had potent anti-HIV properties. The compound was originally named D4T, and Bristol-Myers Squibb developed and marketed this drug under its more common name, Zerit. It became a key drug as part of the first combination therapy for treating AIDS. Realizing that this treatment could provide great benefits to those struggling with the growing HIV crisis in impoverished Africa, Doctors Without Borders and Yale students later lobbied Yale University and Bristol-Myers Squibb to make Zerit available at a low cost for the African market. Prusoff quickly joined the effort, even though it meant a loss of personal income. "We are not doing this to make money, we are interested in developing a compound that would be a benefit to society," he explained. The effort to make Zerit more affordable was a success: millions of people around the world benefited from Prusoff's research and humanitarian efforts.

Though William Prusoff officially retired at age 70, he never stopped working and continued to be industrious. Until his death, his work as professor emeritus concentrated on the potential for using boronated-thymidine analogs as sensitizing cancer agents for neutron therapy.

== Prizes ==
Among his many accolades, Prusoff received the ASPET Award from the American Society for Pharmacology and Experimental Therapeutics and the Peter Parker Medal, Yale School of Medicine's highest award. He also received the Inaugural Lifetime Achievement Award from the Yale Comprehensive Cancer Center. His legacy was further solidified when the School of Medicine established an endowed chair in his name and the Department of Pharmacology named one of its conference rooms after him. In addition, the International Society for Antiviral Research established the William Prusoff Young Investigator Lecture Award.

Prusoff established the William H. Prusoff Foundation to support various programs, including the United Way and the Yale Initiative for the Interdisciplinary Study of Anti-Semitism. He dedicated his life to the service of others because he saw generosity and helping as a natural extension of the human condition.
