= Czechoslovak Academy of Sciences =

The Czechoslovak Academy of Sciences (Czech: Československá akademie věd, Slovak: Česko-slovenská akadémia vied) was established in 1953 to be the scientific center for Czechoslovakia. It was succeeded by the Czech Academy of Sciences (Akademie věd České republiky) and Slovak Academy of Sciences (Slovenská akadémia vied) in 1992.

== History ==
The Royal Czech Society of Sciences, which encompassed both the humanities and the natural sciences, was established in the Czech Crown lands in 1784.

After the Communist regime came to power in Czechoslovakia in 1948, all scientific, non-university institutions and learned societies were dissolved and, in their place, the Czechoslovak Academy of Sciences was founded by Act No. 52/1952. It comprised both a complex of research institutes and a learned society. The Slovak Academy of Sciences, established in 1942 and re-established in 1953, was a formal part of the Czechoslovak Academy of Sciences from 1960 to 1992.

During the 1960s the academy operated a publishing house, the Publishing House of the Czechoslovak Academy of Sciences, some whose books and book series, such as New Horizons, were jointly published with Artia.

In 1992, the Academy of Sciences of the Czech Republic was established by Act No. 283/1992.

== Presidents ==
- Zdeněk Nejedlý (1952–1962)
- František Šorm (1962–1965; 1965–1969)
- Jaroslav Kožešník (1969–1970, 1970–1977, 1977–1980)
- Bohumil Kvasil (1981–1985)
- Josef Říman (1985–1989)
- Otto Wichterle (1990–1992)

== Notable members ==
- Jaroslav Heyrovský, who won the Nobel Prize in Chemistry in 1959
- Otto Wichterle for his invention of soft contact lenses. Wichterle was also the first president of the academy after the revival of democracy in the Czech Republic.
- astrophysicist Jiří Grygar
- mathematicians Eduard Čech and Otakar Borůvka
- chemist Antonín Holý
- Polish mathematician Czesław Olech
- cannabis researcher and chemist Lumír Ondřej Hanuš
- biomedical scientist Ján Vilček
- statistician Zbyněk Šidák

== See also ==
- Academy of Sciences of the Czech Republic
- Slovak Academy of Sciences
