= Cidofovir =

Antiviral drug

Clinical data
- Trade names: Vistide
- AHFS/Drugs.com: Monograph
- Pregnancy category: AU: D
- Routes of administration: Intravenous
- ATC code: J05AB12 (WHO)

Legal status
- Legal status: AU: S4 (Prescription only); CA: ℞-only; UK: POM (Prescription only); US: ℞-only

Pharmacokinetic data
- Bioavailability: complete
- Protein binding: <6%
- Elimination half-life: 2.6 hours (active metabolites: 15–65 hours)
- Excretion: renal The above pharmacokinetic parameters are measured for cidofovir used in conjunction with probenecid.

Identifiers
- IUPAC name: ({[(S)-1-(4-amino-2-oxo-1,2-dihydropyrimidin-1-yl)-3-hydroxypropan-2-yl]oxy}methyl)phosphonic acid
- CAS Number: 113852-37-2
- PubChem CID: 60613
- DrugBank: DB00369
- ChemSpider: 54636
- UNII: 768M1V522C
- KEGG: C06909
- ChEBI: CHEBI:3696
- ChEMBL: ChEMBL152
- NIAID ChemDB: 001049
- CompTox Dashboard (EPA): DTXSID3043734
- ECHA InfoCard: 100.166.433

Chemical and physical data
- Formula: C_{8}H_{14}N_{3}O_{6}P
- Molar mass: 279.189 g·mol^{−1}
- 3D model (JSmol): Interactive image
- Specific rotation: -97.3
- Melting point: 260 °C (500 °F)
- SMILES: O=C1/N=C(\C=C/N1C[C@H](OCP(=O)(O)O)CO)N
- InChI: InChI=1S/C8H14N3O6P/c9-7-1-2-11(8(13)10-7)3-6(4-12)17-5-18(14,15)16/h1-2,6,12H,3-5H2,(H2,9,10,13)(H2,14,15,16)/t6-/m0/s1; Key:VWFCHDSQECPREK-LURJTMIESA-N

Cidofovir, brand name Vistide, is a topical or injectable antiviral medication primarily used as a treatment for cytomegalovirus (CMV) retinitis (an infection of the retina of the eye) in people with AIDS.

Cidofovir was approved for medical use in 1996.

== Medical use ==
=== DNA virus ===
Its only indication that has received regulatory approval worldwide is cytomegalovirus retinitis. Cidofovir has also shown efficacy in the treatment of aciclovir-resistant HSV infections. Cidofovir has also been investigated as a treatment for progressive multifocal leukoencephalopathy with successful case reports of its use. Despite this, the drug failed to demonstrate any efficacy in controlled studies. Cidofovir might have anti-smallpox efficacy and might be used on a limited basis in the event of a bioterror incident involving smallpox cases. Brincidofovir, a cidofovir derivative with much higher activity against smallpox that can be taken orally has been developed. It has inhibitory effects on varicella-zoster virus replication in vitro although no clinical trials have been done to date, likely due to the abundance of safer alternatives such as aciclovir. Cidofovir shows anti-BK virus activity in a subgroup of transplant recipients. Cidofovir is being investigated as a complementary intralesional therapy against papillomatosis caused by HPV.

It first received FDA approval on 26 June 1996, TGA approval on 30 April 1998 and EMA approval on 23 April 1997.

It has been used topically to treat warts.

=== Other ===
It has been suggested as an antitumour agent, due to its suppression of FGF2.

== Administration ==
Cidofovir is only available as an intravenous formulation. Cidofovir is to be administered with probenecid which decreases side effects to the kidney. Probenecid mitigates nephrotoxicity by inhibiting organic anion transport of the proximal tubule epithelial cells of the kidney. In addition, hydration must be administered to patients receiving cidofovir. 1 liter of normal saline is recommended in conjunction with each dose of cidofovir.

== Side effects ==
The major dose-limiting side effect of cidofovir is nephrotoxicity (i.e., kidney damage). Other common side effects (occurring in >1% of people treated with the drug) include:

- Nausea
- Vomiting
- Neutropenia
- Hair loss
- Weakness
- Headache
- Chills
- Decreased intraocular pressure
- Uveitis
- Iritis

Whereas uncommon side effects include: anaemia and elevated liver enzymes and rare side effects include: tachycardia and Fanconi syndrome. Probenecid (a uricosuric drug) and intravenous saline should always be administered with each cidofovir infusion to prevent this nephrotoxicity.

=== Contraindications ===
Hypersensitivity to cidofovir or probenecid (as probenecid needs to be given concurrently to avoid nephrotoxicity).

== Interactions ==
It is known to interact with nephrotoxic agents (e.g. amphotericin B, foscarnet, IV aminoglycosides, IV pentamide, vancomycin, tacrolimus, non-steroid anti-inflammatory drugs, etc.) to increase their nephrotoxic potential. As it must be given concurrently with probenecid it is advised that drugs that are known to interact with probenecid (e.g. drugs that probenecid interferes with the renal tubular secretion of, such as paracetamol, aciclovir, aminosalicylic acid, etc.) are also withheld.

== Mechanism of action ==
Its active metabolite, cidofovir diphosphate, inhibits viral replication by selectively inhibiting viral DNA polymerases. It also inhibits human polymerases, but this action is 8–600 times weaker than its actions on viral DNA polymerases. It also incorporates itself into viral DNA, hence inhibiting viral DNA synthesis during reproduction.

It possesses in vitro activity against the following viruses:

- Human herpesviruses
- Adenoviruses
- Human poxviruses (including the smallpox virus)
- Human papillomavirus

== Veterinary use ==
Cidofovir opthalmic solution can be used to treat feline viral rhinotracheitis in cats.

== History ==
Cidofovir was discovered at the Institute of Organic Chemistry and Biochemistry, Prague, by Antonín Holý, and developed by Gilead Sciences and is marketed with the brand name Vistide by Gilead in the US, and by Pfizer elsewhere.

== Synthesis ==
Cidofovir can be synthesized from a pyrimidone derivative and a protected derivative of glycidol.

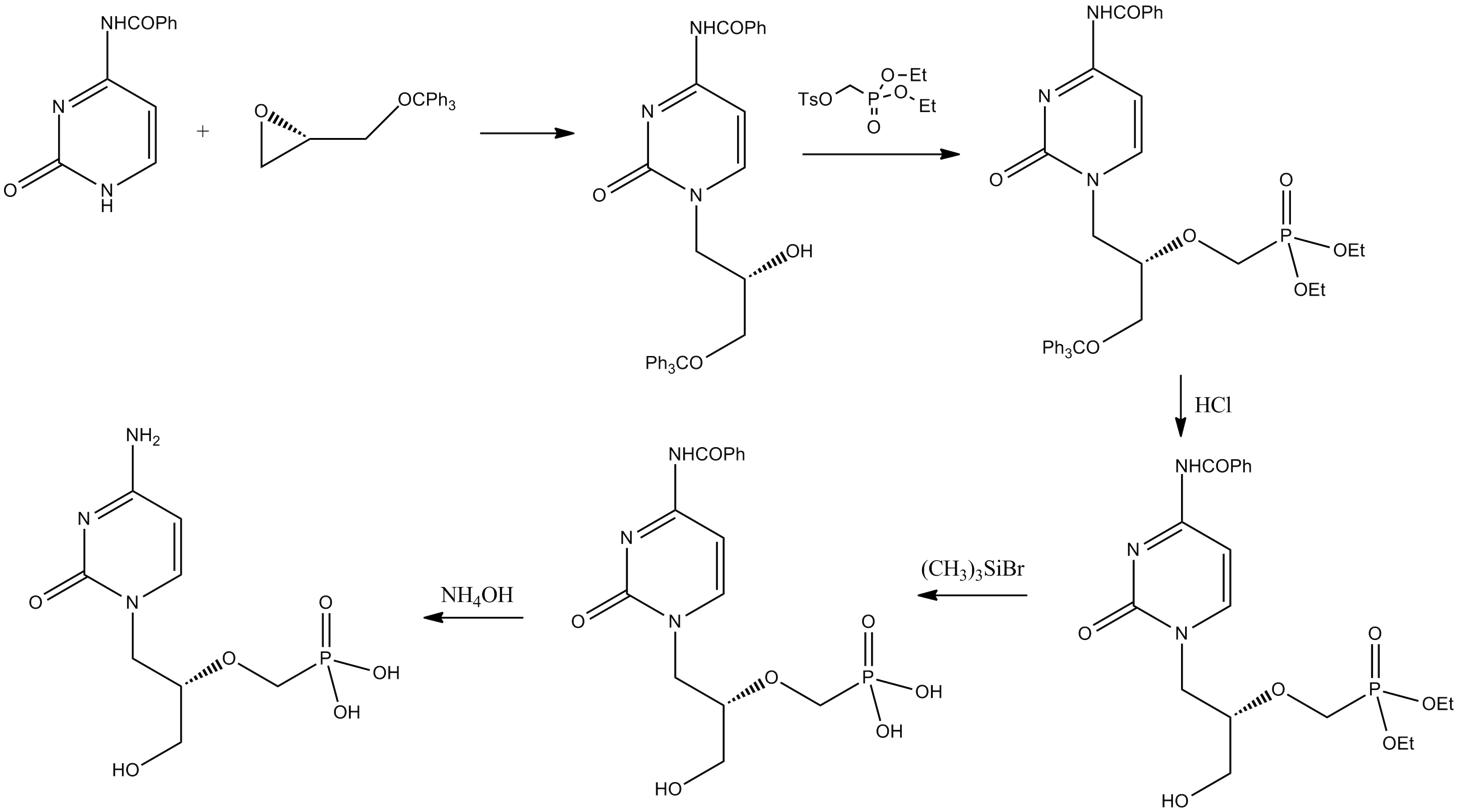

== See also ==
- Brincidofovir, a prodrug of cidofovir
