= Rega Institute for Medical Research =

Belgian biomedical research institute

Coordinates: 50°52′39.95″N 4°41′45.06″E

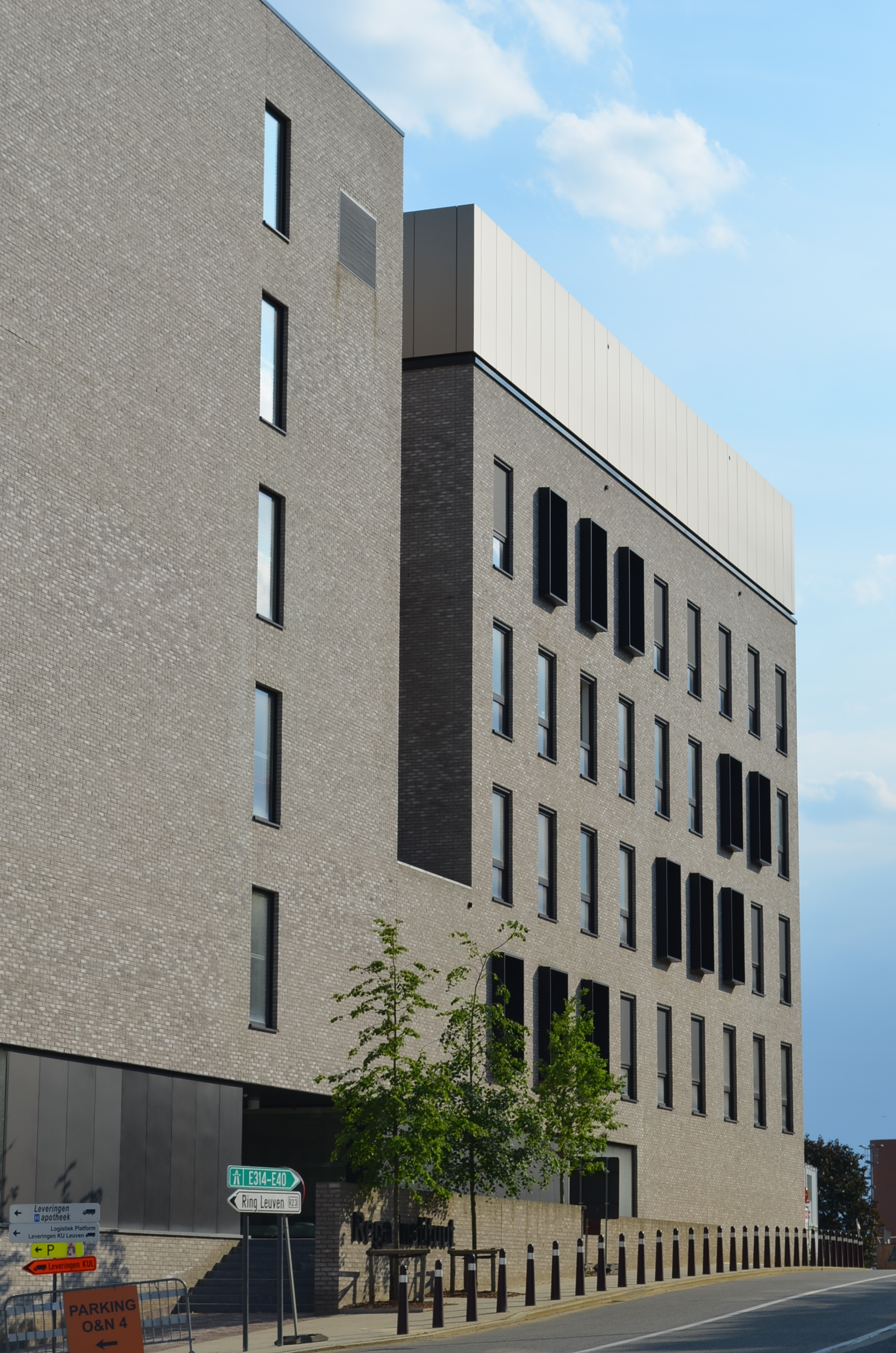
Rega Institute

The Rega Institute for Medical Research is a Belgian scientific establishment that is part of the Catholic University of Leuven (Leuven) in central Belgium. The Rega Institute is an interfacultary biomedical research institute of the Catholic University of Leuven and consists of departments of medicine and pharmacology.

== Divisions ==
- Molecular Bacteriology
- Clinical and Epidemiological Virology
- Immunobiology
- Medicinal Chemistry
- Molecular Immunology
- Virology and Chemotherapy

== History ==
The Rega Institute was founded in 1954 within the unitary Catholic University of Leuven by Pieter De Somer, who named it after Henri-Joseph Rega, a Professor at the Old University of Leuven in the 18th century. The building of the Rega Institute was constructed in 1954 and paid for by the company Recherche et Industrie Thérapeutiques (R.I.T.) in Rixensart, where Dr. De Somer had a leading function. During the sixties, De Somer withdrew from R.I.T. In 1968, he became the founder and first rector of the Dutch-speaking Katholieke Universiteit te Leuven. From 1970 on, the Rega Institute has had worldwide cooperation with a lot of industrial companies. Since 1985, after rector P. De Somer died, the management of the Institute consists of professors from the laboratories housed in the Institute.

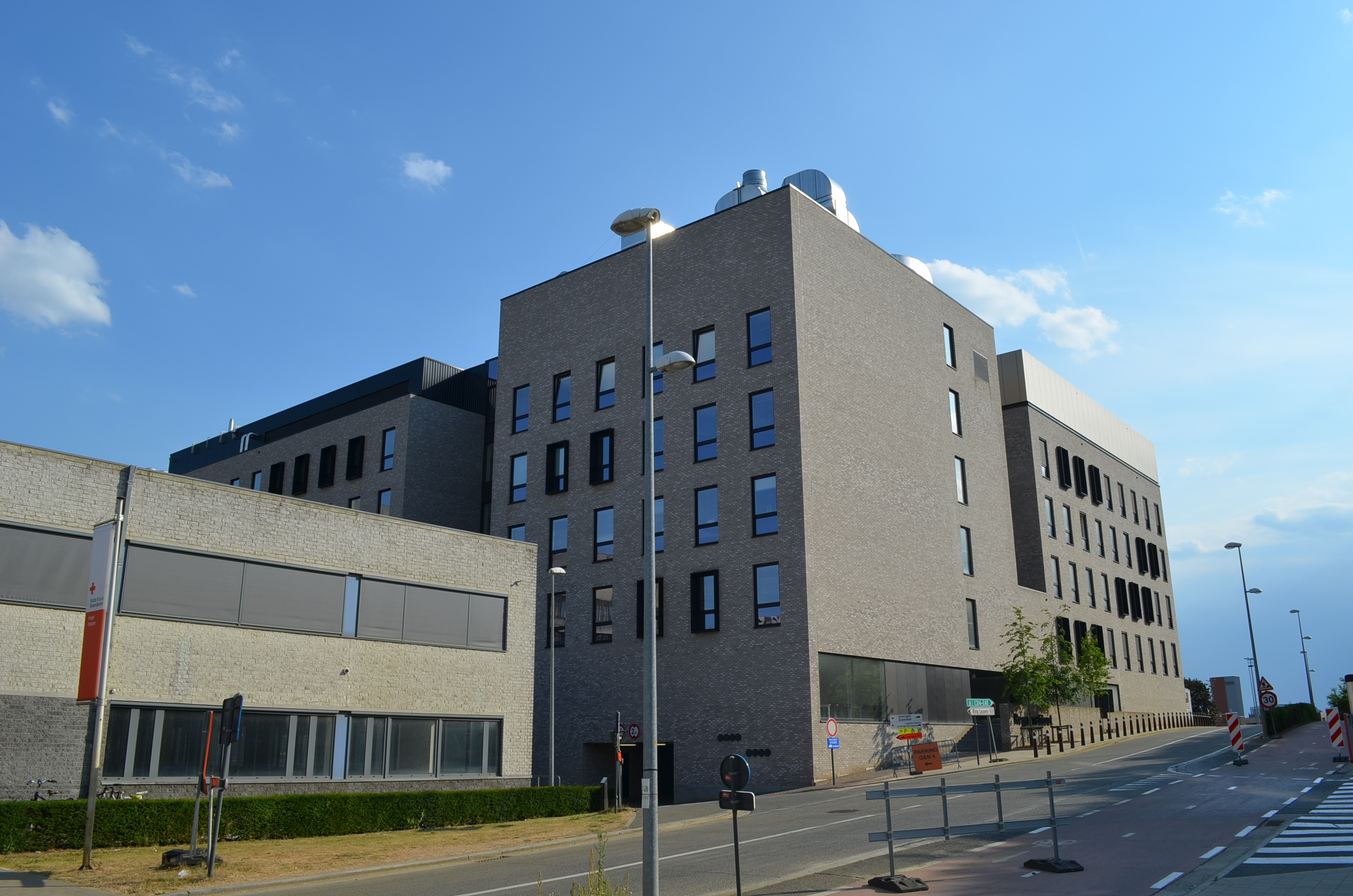
New site as of 2017

In 1987, the Rega Institute entered into a cooperation with Janssen Pharmaceutica (led by Dr. Paul Janssen). This collaboration would result in the discovery of a totally new class of HIV Reverse Transcriptase (RT) inhibitors, the so-called Non-Nucleoside RT Inhibitors or NNRTI's. NNRTIs distinguish themselves of the NRTI's because they do not bind at the catalytic place of the enzyme (i.e. the place where the normal substrate binds himself, such as dATP, dGTP, dCTP or dTTP) but to another, allosteric binding site. The NNRTIs block the normal enzymatic activity of the RT and thereby interrupt the replication cycle of HIV. As a result of the "Rega-Janssen" cooperation several prototypes of NNRTIs, among which the so-called TIBO ("TetrahydroImidazoBenzodiazepinOne") and alpha-APA (Alpha-AnilidoPhenylAcetamide) derivatives were created. This research, in cooperation with Tibotec, resulted in a particular powerful anti-HIV compound, Rilpivirine (TMC-278). NNRTIs are at the moment considered one of the essential ingredients of so-called anti-HIV cocktails. The best well-known NNRTIs are nevirapine and efavirenz.

== Achievements ==
The Nucleoside analogs, d4T, 3'-fluoro-3'-deoxythymidine (FLT) and 3'-fluorodideoxyguanosine (FLG), and the NNRTI's 1-[(2-hydroxy-ethoxy) methyl]-6-phenylthiothymine (HEPT), tetrahydro-imidazo[4,5,1-jk][1,4]-benzodiazepine-2(1H)-one and -thione (TIBO) and alpha-anilinophenylacetamide (alpha-APA) were first described at the Rega Institute. The anti-viral drugs Brivudine and Tenofovir were discovered at the Rega Institute.
