= Tenofovir disoproxil =

Antiviral drug used to treat or prevent HIV and hepatitis infections

- Molecular structure of tenofovir disoproxil

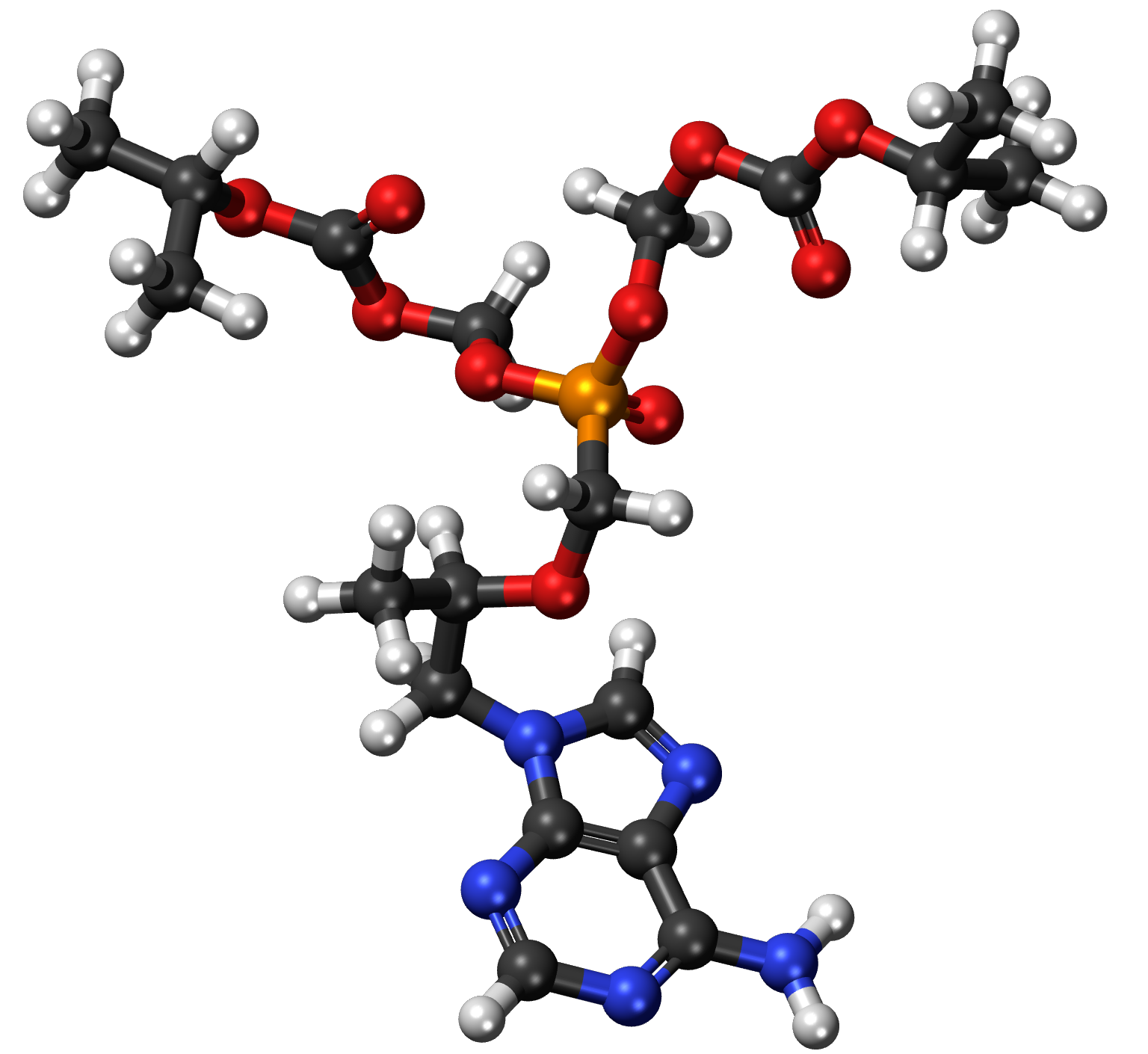
- 3D representation of a tenofovir disoproxil molecule

Clinical data
- Pronunciation: /ˌtəˈnoʊfəvɪər ˌdɪsəˈprɑːksəl/
- Trade names: Viread, others
- Other names: Bis(POC)PMPA
- AHFS/Drugs.com: Monograph
- MedlinePlus: a602018
- License data: US DailyMed: Tenofovir disoproxil
- Pregnancy category: AU: B3
- Routes of administration: By mouth
- ATC code: J05AF07 (WHO)

Legal status
- Legal status: AU: S4 (Prescription only); CA: ℞-only; UK: POM (Prescription only); US: ℞-only; EU: Rx-only

Pharmacokinetic data
- Bioavailability: 25%
- Metabolism: Ester hydrolysis
- Metabolites: Tenofovir

Identifiers
- IUPAC name: Bis{[(isopropoxycarbonyl)oxy]methyl} ({[(2R)-1-(6-amino-9H-purin-9-yl)-2-propanyl]oxy}methyl)phosphonate
- CAS Number: 201341-05-1
- PubChem CID: 5481350
- DrugBank: DB00300
- ChemSpider: 4587262
- UNII: F4YU4LON7I
- KEGG: C13480
- ChEBI: CHEBI:63717
- ChEMBL: ChEMBL1538
- NIAID ChemDB: 080741
- CompTox Dashboard (EPA): DTXSID9040132
- ECHA InfoCard: 100.129.993

Chemical and physical data
- Formula: C_{19}H_{30}N_{5}O_{10}P
- Molar mass: 519.448 g·mol^{−1}
- 3D model (JSmol): Interactive image
- SMILES: C[C@H](Cn1cnc2c1ncnc2N)OCP(=O)(OCOC(=O)OC(C)C)OCOC(=O)OC(C)C
- InChI: InChI=1S/C19H30N5O10P/c1-12(2)33-18(25)28-9-31-35(27,32-10-29-19(26)34-13(3)4)11-30-14(5)6-24-8-23-15-16(20)21-7-22-17(15)24/h7-8,12-14H,6,9-11H2,1-5H3,(H2,20,21,22)/t14-/m1/s1; Key:JFVZFKDSXNQEJW-CQSZACIVSA-N

Tenofovir

Clinical data
- Other names: 9-(2-Phosphonyl-methoxypropyly)adenine (PMPA)
- MedlinePlus: a602018
- ATC code: None

Pharmacokinetic data
- Protein binding: < 1%
- Metabolism: Phosphorylation
- Metabolites: Tenofovir diphosphate (active metabolite)
- Elimination half-life: 17 hours
- Excretion: Kidney

Identifiers
- IUPAC name: ({[(2R)-1-(6-amino-9H-purin-9-yl)propan-2-yl]oxy}methyl)phosphonic acid
- CAS Number: 147127-20-6
- PubChem CID: 464205
- DrugBank: DB14126
- ChemSpider: 408154
- UNII: 99YXE507IL
- KEGG: D06074
- ChEBI: CHEBI:63625
- ChEMBL: ChEMBL483
- CompTox Dashboard (EPA): DTXSID9040132
- ECHA InfoCard: 100.129.993

Chemical and physical data
- Formula: C_{9}H_{14}N_{5}O_{4}P
- Molar mass: 287.216 g·mol^{−1}
- 3D model (JSmol): Interactive image
- SMILES: O=P(O)(O)CO[C@H](C)Cn1c2ncnc(c2nc1)N
- InChI: InChI=1S/C9H14N5O4P/c1-6(18-5-19(15,16)17)2-14-4-13-7-8(10)11-3-12-9(7)14/h3-4,6H,2,5H2,1H3,(H2,10,11,12)(H2,15,16,17)/t6-/m1/s1; Key:SGOIRFVFHAKUTI-ZCFIWIBFSA-N

Tenofovir disoproxil, sold under the brand name Viread among others, is a medication used to treat chronic hepatitis B and to prevent and treat HIV/AIDS. It is generally recommended for use with other antiretrovirals. It may be used for prevention of HIV/AIDS among those at high risk before exposure, and after a needlestick injury or other potential exposure. It is sold both by itself and together in combinations such as emtricitabine/tenofovir, efavirenz/emtricitabine/tenofovir, and elvitegravir/cobicistat/emtricitabine/tenofovir. It does not cure HIV/AIDS or hepatitis B. It is available by mouth as a tablet or powder.

Common side effects include nausea, rash, diarrhea, headache, pain, depression, and weakness. Severe side effects include high blood lactate and an enlarged liver. There are no absolute contraindications. It is often recommended during pregnancy and appears to be safe. It is a nucleotide reverse transcriptase inhibitor and works by decreasing the ability of the viruses to replicate.

Tenofovir was patented in 1996 and approved for use in the United States in 2001. It is on the World Health Organization's List of Essential Medicines. It is available in the United States as a generic medication as of 2017.

== Medical uses ==
Tenofovir disoproxil is used for HIV-1 infection and chronic hepatitis B treatment. For HIV-1 infection, tenofovir is indicated in combination with other antiretroviral agents for people 2 years of age and older. For chronic hepatitis B patients, tenofovir is indicated for patients 12 years of age and older.

=== HIV risk reduction ===
Tenofovir can be used for HIV prevention in people who are at high risk for infection through sexual transmission or injecting drug use. A Cochrane review examined the use of tenofovir for prevention of HIV before exposure and found that both tenofovir alone and the tenofovir/emtricitabine combination decreased the risk of contracting HIV for high risk patients. The U.S. Centers for Disease Control and Prevention (CDC) also conducted a study in partnership with the Thailand Ministry of Public Health to ascertain the effectiveness of providing people who inject drugs illicitly with daily doses of tenofovir as a prevention measure. The results revealed a 48.9% reduced incidence of the virus among the group of subjects who received the drug in comparison to the control group who received a placebo.

== Adverse effects ==
Tenofovir disoproxil is generally well tolerated with low discontinuation rates among the HIV and chronic hepatitis B population. There are no contraindications for use of this drug. The most commonly reported side effects due to use of tenofovir disoproxil were dizziness, nausea, and diarrhea. Other adverse effects include depression, sleep disturbances, headache, itching, rash, and fever. The US boxed warning cautions potential onset of lactic acidosis or liver damage due to use of tenofovir disoproxil.

Long term use of tenofovir disoproxil is associated with nephrotoxicity and bone loss. Presentation of nephrotoxicity can appear as Fanconi syndrome, acute kidney injury, or decline of glomerular filtration rate (GFR). Discontinuation of tenofovir disoproxil can potentially lead to reversal of renal impairment. Nephrotoxicity may be due to proximal tubules accumulation of Tenofovir disoproxil leading to elevated serum concentrations.

== Interactions ==
Tenofovir interacts with didanosine and HIV-1 protease inhibitors. Tenofovir increases didanosine concentrations and can result in adverse effects such as pancreatitis and neuropathy. Tenofovir also interacts with HIV-1 protease inhibitors such as atazanavir, by decreasing atazanavir concentrations while increasing tenofovir concentrations. In addition, since tenofovir is excreted by the kidney, medications that impair renal function can also cause problems.

== Pharmacology ==
=== Mechanism of action ===
Tenofovir disoproxil is a nucleotide analog reverse-transcriptase inhibitor (NtRTI). It selectively inhibits viral reverse transcriptase, a crucial enzyme in retroviruses such as human immunodeficiency virus (HIV), while showing limited inhibition of human enzymes, such as DNA polymerases α, β, and mitochondrial DNA polymerase γ. In vivo tenofovir disoproxil fumarate is converted to tenofovir, an acyclic analog of deoxyadenosine 5'-monophosphate (dAMP). Tenofovir lacks a hydroxyl group in the position corresponding to the 3' carbon of the dAMP, preventing the formation of the 5′ to 3′ phosphodiester linkage essential for DNA chain elongation. Once incorporated into a growing DNA strand, tenofovir causes premature termination of DNA transcription, preventing viral replication.

=== Pharmacokinetics ===
Tenofovir disoproxil is a prodrug that is quickly absorbed from the gut and cleaved to release tenofovir. Inside cells, tenofovir is phosphorylated to tenofovir diphosphate (which is analogous to a triphosphate, as tenofovir itself already has one phosphonate residue), the active compound that inhibits reverse transcriptase via chain termination.

In fasting persons, bioavailability is 25%, and highest blood plasma concentrations are reached after one hour. When taken with fatty food, highest plasma concentrations are reached after two hours, and the area under the curve is increased by 40%. It is an inhibitor of cytochrome P450 1A2.

Tenofovir is mainly excreted via the kidneys, both by glomerular filtration and by tubular secretion using the transport proteins OAT1, OAT3 and ABCC4.

=== Detection in body fluids ===
Tenofovir may be measured in plasma by liquid chromatography. Such testing is useful for monitoring therapy and to prevent drug accumulation and toxicity in people with kidney or liver problems.

== Chemistry ==
Tenofovir is a derivative of adenine and this was the chemical starting point for its first published synthesis which was included in patents to the compound. During drug development, attention switched to the phosphonate ester derivative, tenofovir disoproxil, which was the subject of extensive process chemistry to provide a viable manufacturing route.

Adenine is first reacted with a chiral version of propylene carbonate with R absolute configuration, using sodium hydroxide as base. Under these conditions, the reaction is regioselective, with alkylation occurring exclusively in the imidazole ring and at the less-hindered carbon of the dioxolane. In the second step, the hydroxyl group is reacted with a phosphonic acid derivative, using tert-butyllithium as base to ensure selective O-alkylation, with the formation of an ether bond. Tenofovir is formed when the diethyl phosphonate group is converted to its acid using trimethylsilyl chloride in the presence of sodium bromide, a further refinement of the original manufacturing route. The synthesis of the alternative ester in tenofovir disoproxil is completed by alkylation with the appropriate chloromethyl ether derivative and this may be purified as its fumarate salt.

== History ==
Tenofovir was initially synthesized by Antonín Holý at the Institute of Organic Chemistry and Biochemistry of the Czechoslovak Academy of Sciences in Prague. The patent filed in 1986 makes no mention of the potential use of the compound for the treatment of HIV infection but claims activity against herpes simplex virus.

In 1985, Erik De Clercq and Holý described the activity of PMPA against HIV in cell culture. Shortly thereafter, a collaboration with the biotechnology company Gilead Sciences led to the investigation of PMPA's potential as a treatment for HIV infected patients. In 1997 researchers from Gilead and the University of California, San Francisco demonstrated that tenofovir exhibits anti-HIV effects in humans when dosed by subcutaneous injection.

The initial form of tenofovir used in these studies had limited potential for widespread use because it poorly penetrated cells and was not absorbed when given by mouth. Gilead developed a pro-drug version of tenofovir, tenofovir disoproxil. This version of tenofovir is often referred to simply as "tenofovir". In this version of the drug, the two negative charges of the tenofovir phosphonic acid group are masked, thus enhancing oral absorption.

Tenofovir disoproxil was approved in the U.S. in 2001, for the treatment of HIV, and in 2008, for the treatment of chronic hepatitis B.

== Drug forms ==
Tenofovir disoproxil can be taken by mouth and is sold under the brand name Viread, among others. Tenofovir disoproxil is a pro-drug form of tenofovir phosphonate, which is liberated intracellularly and converted to tenofovir disphophate. It is marketed by Gilead Sciences (as the fumarate, abbreviated TDF).

Tenofovir disoproxil is also available in pills which combine a number of antiviral drugs into a single dose. Well-known combinations include Atripla (tenofovir disoproxil/emtricitabine/efavirenz), Complera (tenofovir disoproxil/emtricitabine/rilpivirine), Stribild (tenofovir disoproxil/emtricitabine/elvitegravir/cobicistat), and Truvada (tenofovir disoproxil/emtricitabine).

Gilead has created a second pro-drug form of the active drug, tenofovir diphosphate, called tenofovir alafenamide. It differs from tenofovir disoproxil due to its activation in the lymphoid cells. This allows the active metabolites to accumulate in those cells, leading to lower systemic exposure and potential toxicities.
