= Rudi Pauwels =

Belgian pharmacologist and entrepreneur

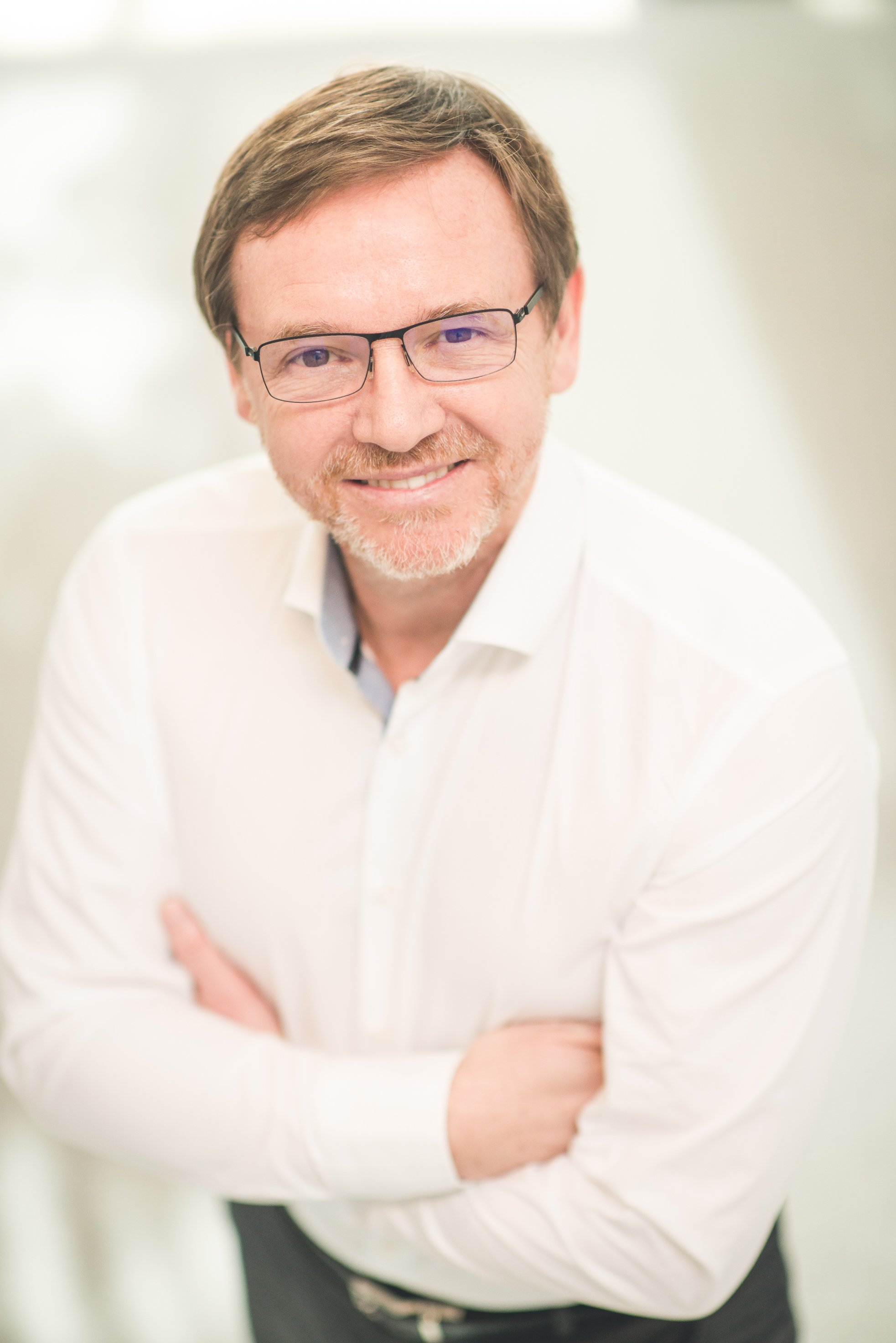
- Dr. Rudi Pauwels
- Born: 1960 (age 65–66)
- Education: Ph.D. in pharmaceutical sciences
- Alma mater: KU Leuven
- Occupations: Pharmaceutical scientist; biotech entrepreneur
- Organization(s): Praesens Foundation, Praesens Care, miDiagnostics
- Awards: Prix Galien MedStartUpAward (2019), Global Technology Pioneer Award (2012), INSEAD Innovator Prize (2002)

Rudi Pauwels (born 1960) is a Belgian pharmacologist and biotech entrepreneur.

He was one of the first researchers in the field of HIV, and he played a key role in the fight against the AIDS pandemic by discovering several widely used anti-HIV drugs during his doctorate studies at the Rega Institute (Leuven, Belgium) and while leading biotech companies Tibotec and Virco.

Since 1994 he has either founded or co-founded several biotech companies, specialising in personalized and high precision medicine. His current roles include founder and president of the Praesens Foundation, chairman of Praesens Care, executive chairman of IMEC/Johns Hopkins spin-off company miDiagnostics and board positions in various companies and research institutes. He is an author of more than 150 peer-reviewed papers and recipient of numerous awards and distinctions.

In 2020 he was appointed as co-chair of the Diagnostics R&D Working Group of the Access to COVID-19 Tools Accelerator.

== Education and early research ==
He studied pharmaceutical sciences at the Katholieke Universiteit Leuven (KU Leuven), Belgium, and graduated as a pharmacist in 1983.

Within a year after the 1983 discovery of HIV, the viral pathogen that causes AIDS, Pauwels began work on the topic while still a doctorate student. In 1984, in the laboratory of Professor Erik De Clercq at the Rega Institute (University of Leuven, Belgium), he started to develop the first laboratory models in search of new anti-HIV compounds. The methods he published were widely used by fellow scientists that joined the search for new anti-AIDS (HIV) treatments.

In 1987, Pauwels obtained a research fellowship of the Janssen Research Foundation, which started a long-standing collaboration and close friendship with the late Dr. Paul Janssen, founder of Janssen Pharmaceuticals. Janssen became a mentor and would influence his pharmaceutical work. In 1990, the Janssen-funded collaboration of his small team at the Rega Institute would lead to the discovery of the first non-nucleoside reverse transcriptase inhibitor (NNRTI). It was also Janssen who would introduce him to Dr. Paul Stoffels, with whom he would collaborate at Tibotec, Virco and Johnson & Johnson.

Pauwels obtained his Ph.D. in pharmaceutical sciences from the KU Leuven in 1990 with greatest distinction (maxima cum laude), with De Clercq and Janssen as his promotors. His thesis was entitled "Development of new agents against the Human Immunodeficiency Virus (HIV)".

== Career ==
=== Tibotec, Virco and Johnson & Johnson ===
A few years after obtaining his Ph.D. and leading a small group of researchers at the Rega Institute, Pauwels began to work on the problem of HIV drug resistance. In 1994, he founded the anti-HIV drug discovery company Tibotec together with his wife, pharmacist Carine Claeys.

A year later they founded, together with Paul Stoffels, the diagnostics company Virco, which would develop HIV-treatment diagnostic services that would help physicians select the optimal therapy for their patients (e.g. Antivirogram).

Tibotec-Virco was acquired by Johnson & Johnson in 2002, after which Pauwels became vice president of Johnson & Johnson's global anti-infectives drug discovery group, focusing on Hepatitis C and respiratory diseases. Here, he worked on drugs and diagnostics for respiratory diseases. In the middle of the SARS crisis in 2003, he started a project to develop an anti-SARS drug discovery system that, in 2020, was used as the basis for efforts to find inhibitors for SARS-CoV-2. This effort, involving a number of pharmaceutical companies, occurred at the Rega Institute, continuing the work based on his original large-scale anti-HIV drug screening and recently received funding from the Bill & Melinda Gates Foundation.

The work of Pauwels and his colleagues resulted in several drugs that were successfully introduced for modern antiviral AIDS therapies. They include next-generation anti-HIV compounds by Tibotec/Johnson & Johnson, Prezista, Intelence and Edurant, as well as the direct precursor to Gilead Sciences' Viread. These drugs, together with the diagnostic technologies by Virco, have helped to turn AIDS into the chronic, manageable disease it is today, for those who have access to the medicines. The drugs have also generated several billion dollar revenues yearly, providing returns for investors and shareholders and helping to finance the R&D for the treatment of important diseases.

In 1999, Pauwels was one of the driving forces behind the creation of the Tibotec spin-out, Galapagos Genomics, that would combine functional genomic technologies from Tibotec and Crucell, a Dutch-based biotech company.

=== Biocartis ===
In early 2000, it became clear to Pauwels that the future of medicine was increasingly depending on our molecular insights of disease. New generations of drugs would target the underlying molecular dysfunctional processes. It meant that measuring relevant biomarkers would become even more essential. But experiences from the global AIDS crisis and Virco in particular, taught him that the operational model of sending samples from patients to central laboratories was time-consuming and wasteful. It appeared that his approach did not scale easily around the world. Ideally, the lab functionality needed to come (in miniaturized format) to patients and their direct environment, not the other way around.

During his Ph.D. studies, he broadened his interests beyond virology into software programming and robotics. Realizing the need for better, scalable diagnostics at the point of need, he decided in 2004 to go on a three-year sabbatical at the Swiss Federal Institute of Technology-EPFL in Lausanne (Switzerland), one of the leading research centres in micro- and nano-technology.

In 2007, he created Biocartis, a molecular diagnostics company that would develop and commercialize the Idylla platform, a fully integrated and automated sample-to-molecular diagnostic (PCR) result solution. The company grew rapidly and was taken public. The company offered precision diagnostics for cancer therapies, but there was ultimately no broader support for his expansion plans into infectious diseases. After leading the company for a decade, he decided in 2017 to further pursue his interests in infectious diseases.

=== Praesens Foundation ===
During the Ebola outbreak in 2014 and 2015, and after spending the better part of his life in laboratories, Pauwels wanted to observe first hand how the world was dealing with outbreaks of that scale. He saw the need for rapid, accurate and easy-to-use diagnostics close to the affected communities.

Inspired by this experience in West Africa, in 2016 he created the Praesens Fund under the Belgian King Baudouin Foundation. The name is related to the Latin word praesens, meaning 'being here now, making an impact'. With the help of a series of early believers – among which collaborators, sponsors and technology providers – the initial sketch of a first-generation mobile lab was soon made a reality.

As the project entered the next stage in 2017, Pauwels created the Praesens Foundation, co-directed by Professor Peter Piot. It is developing, providing and implementing solutions that contribute to better epidemic preparedness, early warning and rapid response for existing and emerging infectious disease threats. In 2017 and 2018, an initial pilot study led by the Praesens Foundation deployed the first all-terrain Mobile Biosafety Laboratory for infectious disease testing across Senegal. It offers rapid deployment, connectivity and technology for effective field diagnostics, reducing turn-around time and improving case management. This has potential to improve epidemic preparedness and contribute to disease intelligence.

The latest initiative is Praesens Care. Through this venture it intends to expand geographically and functionally. Praesens Care offers "lab as a service" (LAAS). Praesens Care offers mobile biosafety laboratories in a regional hub approach to countries and partners to reinforce their healthcare delivery system, with integrated diagnostic services (multi-disease testing and real-time reporting), primary healthcare and community engagement. It offers an outreach capacity to provide medical (e.g. diagnostics, therapies, vaccination) and non-medical (health promotion, social mobilization) services at the peripheral level of the health system, as close as possible to the communities.

=== miDiagnostics ===
In 2018, Pauwels was appointed executive chairman of miDiagnostics, a large life science spin-off company of IMEC and Johns Hopkins University. IMEC is a nano-electronics R&D hub with more than 4,000 engineers and scientists headquartered in Leuven, Belgium.

=== Investment experience ===
In 2007, Pauwels joined Advent Partners, a venture capital firm in London. He assisted Advent in reviewing investment opportunities and supported several portfolio companies. He was involved in the formation of Respivert Ltd., where he acted as chairman of the board. Respivert was a molecule drug discovery company working towards the identification of new treatments for patients with chronic obstructive pulmonary disease. Respivert was acquired by Johnson & Johnson in 2010.

=== Other professional roles ===
- 2020–present: Co-chair of the Diagnostics R&D Working Group of the Access to COVID-19 Tools Accelerator
- 2008-2018: Member of the Scientific Advisory Board of IMEC in Leuven, Belgium
- 2015-2019: Member of the Advisory Board of A*STAR's Accelerate, a division of the Singapore Agency for Science, Technology and Research
- 2014-2015: Board member of MDx Health
- 2014-2015: Board member of MyCartis NV, a spin-off of Biocartis
- 2011-2012: Board member of Flanders Bio, Belgium
- 2009-2013: Member of the Advisory Board of A*STAR Explorative Therapeutics Centre, Singapore
- 1995-2003: Lecturer at the Vrije Universiteit Brussel, Belgium
- 1999-2002: Member of the Board of Directors of the Flanders Interuniversity Institute for Biotechnology, Ghent, Belgium
- 1985: Research project at Smith-Kline RIT (now GSK), Genval, Belgium.

== Personal life ==
Pauwels is the father of actress Eline Powell.

== Awards and recognition ==
- 2019: Prix Galien MedStartUp Award for the consortium constituted by the Praesens Foundation, Institut Pasteur, Institut Pasteur de Dakar, University of Nebraska Medical Center and Twist Bioscience.
- 2016: Commandeur in de Leopoldsorde by King Philippe of Belgium.
- 2016: Honorary speaker received at the Distinguished Technopreneur Speaker Forum in Singapore.
- 2016: Golden Honorary Award for Research & Development, Flemish Parliament.
- 2015: First Alumnus of the Year, FarmaLeuven, KU Leuven, Belgium.
- 2013: Honorary Doctorate Degree, Faculty of Pharmaceutical Sciences, University of Ghent, Belgium.
- 2013: Officer in the Order of the Crown (Officier in de Kroonorde) by King Albert II of Belgium.
- 2012: Global Technology Pioneer Award, World Economic Forum, Davos, Switzerland.
- 2010: BioAlps Award, Geneva, Switzerland.
- 2002: INSEAD Innovator Price, Brussels, Belgium.
- 1998: Deloitte & Touch Finalist of European Small Business Person of the Year Award, Vienna, Austria.
- 1996: AIDS-Forschungspreis der Deutsche Gesellschaft für Infektiologie e.V., Germany.
- 1991: Price of the Academy of Medicine of Belgium, Vierde Afdeling, Brussels, Belgium.
- 1988: Prix Franz Leemans, KU Leuven, Woluwe-Saint-Lambert, Belgium.

== Selected publications ==
Pauwels is an author or co-author of more than 150 papers in peer-reviewed journals. A selected list is shown below by topic.

- Development of the first anti-HIV drug discovery lab models:
  1. Sensitive and rapid assay on MT-4 cells for detection of antiviral compounds against the AIDS virus.
  2. Rapid and automated tetrazolium-based colorimetric assay for the detection of anti-HIV compounds.
- First paper on the discovery of the anti-HIV activity of a new class of inhibitors that laid the foundation for the anti-HIV drug portfolio of Gilead Sciences:
  1. Phosphonylmethoxyethyl purine derivatives, a new class of anti-human immunodeficiency virus agents.
- First papers on the discovery of a new category of inhibitors of HIV:
  1. Potent and selective inhibition of HIV-1 replication in vitro by a novel series of TIBO derivatives.
  2. Potent and highly selective HIV-1 specific inhibition by a new series of α-anilino-phenylacetamide (α-APA) derivatives targeted at HIV-1 RT.
  3. New non-nucleoside reverse transcriptase inhibitors (NNRTIs) in development for the treatment of HIV infections.
  4. Discovery of TIBO, a new family of HIV-1 specific reverse transcriptase inhibitors.
- New diagnostic methods to detect drug resistance in HIV-infected patients:
  1. A rapid method for simultaneous detection of phenotypic resistance to inhibitors of protease and reverse transcriptase in recombinant human immunodeficiency virus type 1 isolates from patients treated with antiretroviral drugs.
- Description of the now leading HIV protease inhibitor Prezista:
  1. TMC114, a novel human immunodeficiency virus type 1 protease inhibitor active against protease inhibitor- resistant viruses, including a broad range of clinical isolates.
  2. Discovery and selection of TMC114, a next generation HIV-1 protease inhibitor.
- Development of drug Discovery method for SARS and now also used for SARS-Cov-2:
  1. Development of a homogeneous screening assay for automated detection of antiviral agents active against severe acute respiratory syndrome-associated coronavirus.
- Pilot study of a mobile biosafety laboratory in Senegal for disease surveillance and rapid response:
  1. Field evaluation of a mobile biosafety laboratory in Senegal to strengthen rapid disease outbreak and monitoring.
