= Didier de Chaffoy de Courcelles =

Belgian scientist and businessman (born 1952)

- Born: 19 November 1952 (age 73); Turnhout
- Education: Bachelor of Science degree in chemistry Master of Science; Katholieke Universiteit Leuven; PhD of Science (D.Sc.); University of Antwerp (Antwerp, Belgium)

Didier R.G.G. de Chaffoy de Courcelles (born 19 November 1952, in Turnhout) is a Belgian scientist and businessman. He was senior vice president of Drug Discovery Europe, and Johnson & Johnson Pharmaceutical Research & Development (J&JPRD), a division of Janssen Pharmaceutica (Beerse, Belgium), until 2008 when he left the company.

== Education ==
Didier de Chaffoy de Courcelles went to highschool at the Broeders van Liefde in Turnhout. He obtained a Bachelor of Science degree in chemistry from the Katholieke Universiteit Leuven (Leuven, Belgium). He obtained a Master of Science and a PhD of Science (D.Sc.), as well as an accreditation for teaching and research at academic institutions (G.U.O., venia legendi), from the University of Antwerp (Antwerp, Belgium).

== Career ==
He joined the Janssen Research Foundation in 1981, where he became Director of Biochemistry, Senior Director of Pharmacology, Vice President of Biological Research, and Senior Vice President of Discovery Research until 2008. In addition, he was a member of the J&JPRD Board (Raritan, New Jersey, United States), the board of directors of Janssen Pharmaceutica (Beerse, Belgium) and the Sir James Black Foundation (London, United Kingdom). In 2009 he founded his own company Oto Therapeutics and started teaching at Hasselt University.

== See also ==
- Paul Janssen, founder of Janssen Pharmaceutica

== Sources ==
- Janssen Pharmaceutica
- Didier de Chaffoy de Courcelles
- De aspirine zou vandaag nooit meer goed gekeurd geraken (Article in Trends)
