= Vosselaar =

- Municipality
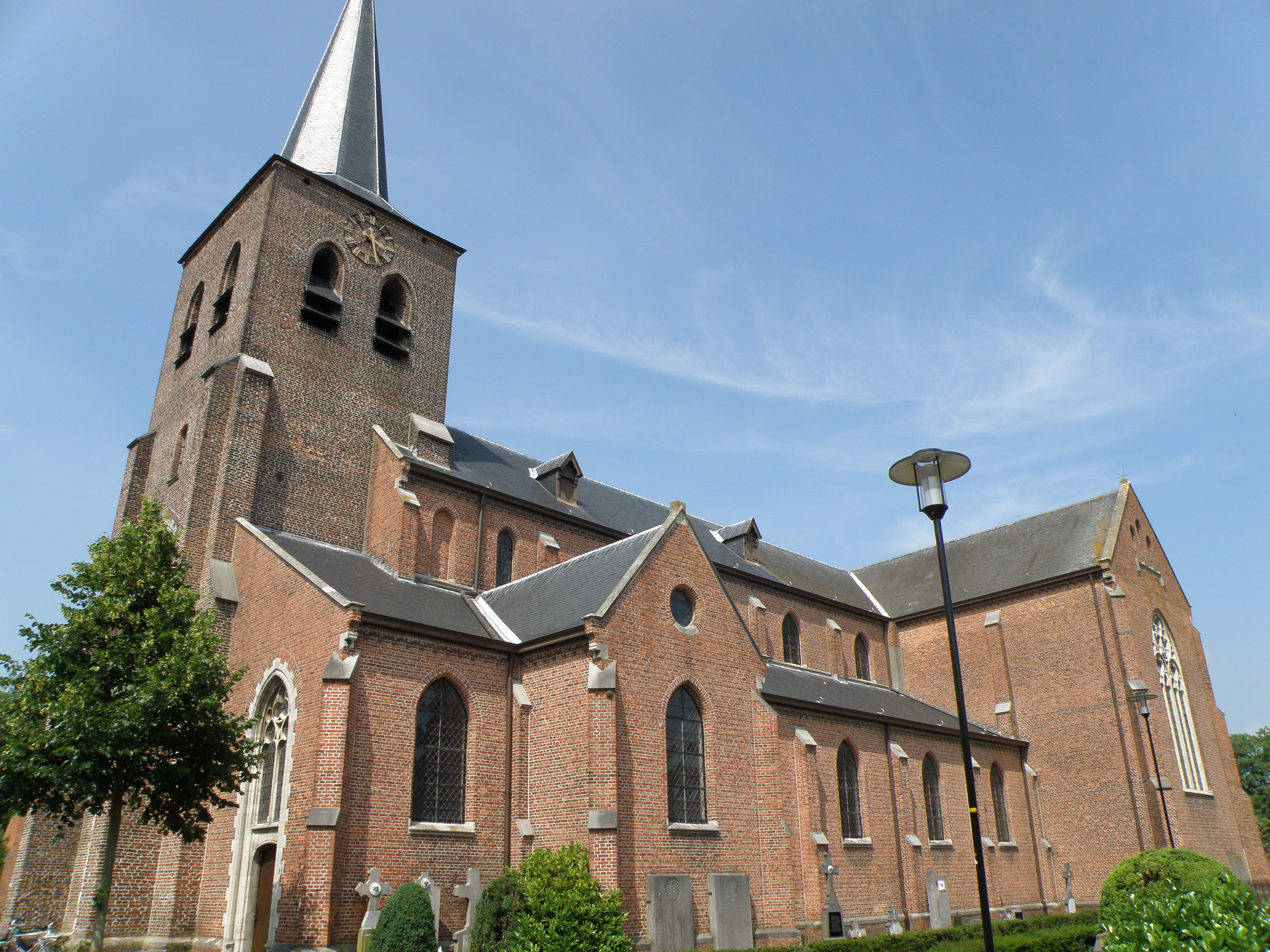

- Flag Coat of arms

- Location of Vosselaar in the province of Antwerp
- Interactive map of Vosselaar
- Location in Belgium
- Coordinates: 51°19′N 04°53′E
- Country: Belgium
- Community: Flemish Community
- Region: Flemish Region
- Province: Antwerp
- Arrondissement: Turnhout

Government
  - Mayor: Gilles Bultinck (CD&V)
  - Governing party: CD&V

Area
  - Total: 11.83 km^{2} (4.57 sq mi)

Population (2018-01-01)
  - Total: 11,159
  - Density: 943.3/km^{2} (2,443/sq mi)
- Postal codes: 2350
- NIS code: 13046
- Area codes: 014
- Website: www.vosselaar.be

Vosselaar (Dutch pronunciation: [ˈvɔsəlaːr]) is a municipality located in the Belgian province of Antwerp. The municipality only comprises the town of Vosselaar proper. In 2021, Vosselaar had a total population of 11,443. The total area is 11.85 km^{2}.

The most famous landmark in Vosselaar is 'De Konijnenberg', a land dune of 36 metres high located in the center of the village.

There are three parishes: "Heieinde", Vosselaar "Dorp" and 't Looy. 't Looy is an upmarket residential area in the woods with a wide variety of large villas and landhouses. In this part of Vosselaar, many Dutch people have settled down, not only because Vosselaar is close to the Dutch border but also because Dutch people are fleeing high taxes and strict building regulations in the Netherlands. Houses here are commonly priced at €1,000,000 and over.

== Notable inhabitants ==
- Ajit Shetty, chairman of the board of directors and Managing Director of Janssen Pharmaceutica
- Paul Janssen (Turnhout, September 12, 1926 – Rome, November 11, 2003), founder and former CEO of Janssen Pharmaceutica
- Cornelis van der Klugt, former president of the Board of Directors of Philips
- Guy Van Nueten, composer, pianist and record producer
- Karel Kaers, a Belgian cyclist.
