= Bob Stouthuysen =

Belgian businessman (1929–2025)

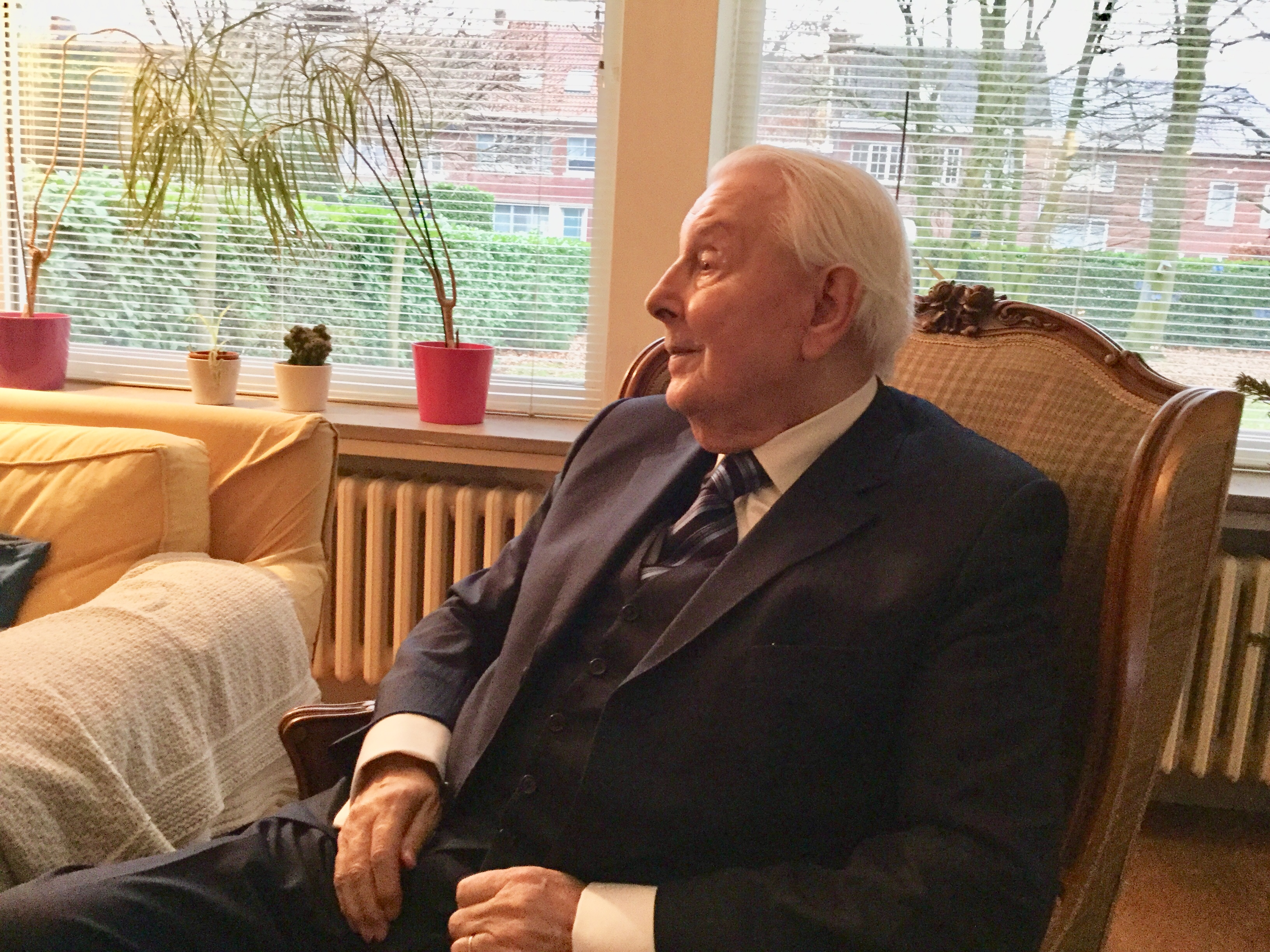
Baron Robert Stouthuysen

Baron Robert Stouthuysen (10 March 1929 – 6 July 2025) was a Belgian businessman. He was the honorary president of the Vlaams Economisch Verbond and of Janssen Pharmaceutica. He lived in Turnhout which is in the Campine region of Flanders.

== Background ==
In 1953, Stouthuysen obtained a law degree at the Katholieke Universiteit Leuven in Leuven, Belgium. In addition, he also graduated with a degree in business management from K.U.Leuven.

Stouthuysen died on 6 July 2025, at the age of 96.

== Career ==
Stouthuysen started his career as a researcher at the productivity research group of K.U. Leuven. In September 1957, the Janssen family invited him to work for Janssen Pharmaceutica. On 1 October 1958, he became the personnel manager of the company and was involved in widely diverse personnel affairs. When Janssen Pharmaceutica was acquired by Johnson & Johnson in 1961, he was appointed to a management position. In 1962 he became the head of the commercial department and in 1963 he became the assistant manager under Frans Van den Bergh.

In 1965, Stouthuysen was officially appointed director of the company. In 1971, he was appointed a member of the board of directors and in 1987 he became the director and in 1988 president of Janssen Operations Worldwide. From November 1976 until May 1981, he was the president of the VEV. On 1 October 1991, he became the chairman of the board of directors. In 2004, he retired and was succeeded by Ajit Shetty.

== See also ==
- Paul Janssen

== Sources ==
- Plato
- In memoriam Dr. Paul Janssen
