= Paul Stoffels =

Belgian MD (born 1962)

Paul, Baron Stoffels (born 8 March 1962 in Turnhout, Belgium) is a Belgian doctor, who studied medicine at the University of Hasselt and the University of Antwerp (UA). In addition he studied Infectious Diseases and Tropical Medicine at the Prince Leopold Institute of Tropical Medicine in Antwerp, Belgium. He is Chief Scientific Officier, Worldwide Chairman of Janssen pharmaceuticals and he is a member of the Johnson & Johnson Executive Committee.

== Career ==
Stoffels worked for four years as a physician and researcher of HIV/AIDS and tropical diseases in Africa, where he met Peter Piot. In 1991 he returned to Belgium and became the Head of Development for the HIV compounds at Janssen Pharmaceutica in Beerse, Belgium. In 1993 he was promoted to Director of Clinical Research and Development for Infectious Diseases and Dermatology. In 1997 he left Janssen Pharmaceuticals and together with Rudi Pauwels co-founded the biotech companies Tibotec and Virco.

When Johnson & Johnson acquired Tibotec-Virco in April 2002, he became Company Group Chairman of the Global Virology Franchise at Johnson & Johnson and Chairman of Tibotec. Stoffels was the Chief Scientific Officer at Johnson & Johnson, and is responsible for the safety of all products of the Johnson & Johnson Family of Companies worldwide as well as leading teams across different sectors (CNS, pain, infectious disease, metabolism, cardiovascular disease, and primary care) to set the companywide innovation agenda.

In 2020 he received the Louis Pasteur Leadership Award in Public Health.

On 12 October 2021 it was announced that Stoffels would be stepping down from his role as Chief Scientific Officer at Johnson & Johnson and into retirement, effective 31 December 2021. A successor was not named.

On January 26, 2022, it was announced that Stoffels would be appointed CEO of the bio-tech company Galapagos, effectively ending his announced retirement.

== See also ==
- Paul Janssen, founder of Janssen Pharmaceutica

== Sources ==
- Paul Stoffels - Johnson & Johnson
