= Paul Lewi =

Paul J. Lewi (4 January 1938 – 28 August 2012) was a Belgian scientist, who elaborated Spectral Map Analysis in 1975 and was one of the cofounders of chemometrics in 1983. Paul Lewi was married with Godelieve Debruyne and they have together 3 children and with Philomena Van Bylen, with 2 children.

== Biography ==
Paul Lewi was born in 1938 in Westmalle, Belgium. His parents, Leo Lewi and Mariette Devocht, were professional artists and teachers. He graduated as Industrial Engineer in Nuclear Chemistry at the Hoger Rijksinstituut voor Technisch Onderwijs en Kernenergiebedrijven Mol, in 1960 and as a Candidate in Mathematical Sciences at the Catholic University of Leuven in 1962. He obtained a PhD in Pharmaceutical Sciences at the Vrije Universiteit Brussel in 1995.

He started working at Janssen Pharmaceutica in 1962, first as mathematical analyst in Cardiovascular Research, then he became the head of Applied Mathematics in 1967, and head of the Scientific Computer department in 1969. He became head of the Information Science department (1973) and finally vice-president of the Center for Molecular Design (CMD) in 1995, which he founded together with Paul Janssen. During his career he elaborated Spectral Map Analysis in 1975 and was one of the cofounders of chemometrics in 1983. He is named as co-inventor of a novel series of anti-HIV compounds (Diarylpyrimidines) including dapivirine, etravirine and rilpivirine. After his retirement he served as visiting professor at the Universities of Leuven, Antwerp and Brussels.

== Publications ==
Books:

- Lewi P.J. (1982). Multivariate data analysis in industrial practice. Research Studies Press, John Wiley & Sons, Chichester etc., 1982, ISBN 0-471-10466-3.
- Lewi P.J. (1995). Spectral mapping of drug-test specificities with extensions to the classification of receptor proteins and the correlation of activity spectra. Vrije Universiteit Brussel, Brussel, 1995, proefschrift faculteit geneeskunde en farmacie.
- D.L. Massart, B. Vandeginste, L. Buydens, S. De Jong, P. Lewi and J. Smeyers-Verbeke, Handbook of Chemometrics and Qualimetrics. Vol 20 A, (1997), Elsevier.
- B. Vandeginste, D.L. Massart, L. Buydens, S. De Jong, P. Lewi and J. Smeyers-Verbeke, Handbook of Chemometrics and Qualimetrics. Vol 20 B, (1998), Elsevier.

Articles, a selection:

- Lewi P.J. (1976). "Spectral mapping, a technique for classifying biological activity profiles of chemical compounds. Arzneim. Forsch". in: Drug Res. 26, 1295–1300.
- Lewi P.J. (1981). "Multidimensional analysis of pharmacological data". In: Rev Pure Appl Pharmacol Sci. 1981 Jul–Sep;2(3):229-90.
- Lewi P.J. (1987). "The use of multivariate statistics in industrial pharmacology". In: Pharmacol Ther [B]. 1978;3(4):481–537.
- Lewi P.J. (1989). "Spectral Map Analysis. Factorial analysis of contrasts, especially from log ratios." In: Chemometr. Intell. Lab. Syst., 5 (2), 105–116, 1989.
- Lewi P.J, Mullie A, Quets A. (1989). "Relevance and significance of pre-CPR conditions in cardio-pulmonary-cerebral resuscitation. A graphic analysis by means of Spectramap". The Cerebral Resuscitation Study Group, Resuscitation. 1989;17 Suppl:S35-44; discussion S199-206.
- Lewi P.J. (1990). K. Andries, B. Dewindt, J. Snoeks, L. Wouters, H. Moereels, P.J. Lewi, "Two groups of rhinoviruses revealed by a panel of antiviral compounds present sequence divergence and differential pathogenicity". In: J Virol, 64 (3), 1117–1123, 1990.
- Lewi P.J. (2005). "Spectral mapping, a personal and historical account of an adventure in multivariate data analysis". In: Chemometr. Intell. Lab. Syst., 77, 215–223, 2005.
- 2006. "Speaking of Graphics".
