= Ortho Pharmaceutical =

Subsidiary of Johnson and Johnson

- Industry: pharmaceutical
- Founded: 1931
- Defunct: 1993; 32 years ago
- Fate: Merged with McNeil Pharmaceuticals in the US and Janssen Pharmaceutica in Canada (Both are now Johnson & Johnson)
- Successors: McNeil Pharmaceuticals in the US and Janssen Pharmaceutica in Canada later both became Johnson & Johnson
- Area served: United States

Ortho Pharmaceutical was initially formed in the United States in 1931 as a subsidiary of Johnson & Johnson to market the first prescription spermicidal contraceptive jelly, Ortho-Gynol.

== History ==
In the 1940s, Ortho introduced the coil-spring diaphragm, and assisted in the development of the Papanicolaou smear stain to screen for cervical cancer.

In 1963, Ortho introduced the second oral contraceptive available in the United States (Ortho-Novum 10 and Ortho-Novum 2, produced by Syntex).
In 1964, Ortho bought rights to and marketed the Gynekoil (Margulies Coil) and Lippes Loop inert plastic IUDs in the United States until the mid-1970s and 1985, respectively.
In 1968, Ortho introduced RhoGAM Rho(D) immune globulin, the first medication developed to prevent Rh hemolytic disease of the newborn.

In 1973, Ortho and Syntex introduced the first progestogen only pills (mini-pills) available in the United States, Mirconor and Nor-QD.

In 1982, Ortho introduced the first biphasic oral contraceptive available in the United States, Ortho-Novum 10/11.
In 1984, Ortho introduced the first triphasic oral contraceptive available in the United States, Ortho-Novum 7/7/7.
In 1989, the FDA approved Ortho Cyclen containing the first new progestin (norgestimate) approved in over 20 years in the United States.

In 1992, Ortho introduced Ortho Tri-Cyclen in the United States, which in 1996 became the first oral contraceptive with an FDA-approved non-contraceptive indication (treatment of moderate acne).
From 1995 to 2003, Ortho marketed the ParaGard copper T-380A IUD in the United States.

In 2001, Ortho introduced the Ortho Evra transdermal contraceptive patch in the United States.

In 1993, Ortho Pharmaceutical merged with McNeil Pharmaceutical in 1993 to form Ortho-McNeil Pharmaceutical.

In Canada, Ortho Products began operations in Montreal in 1941. The company started with one product and three employees and it was one of the first companies in Canada to make oral contraceptives. Moving to Toronto in 1944, the company outgrew a number of rented facilities until its own facilities were constructed in 1955. Continued growth required a number of plant expansions. Ortho Pharmaceutical Canada merged with McNeil Pharmaceutical Canada in 1991, and merged with Janssen Pharmaceutica Canada in 1995 to form Janssen-Ortho.

== See also ==
- McNeil Laboratories
- Ortho-McNeil Pharmaceutical
- Janssen Pharmaceutica
- Cilag
- Janssen-Cilag
