= Staf Van Reet =

Belgian scientist and businessman

Staf Van Reet is a Belgian scientist and businessman. Currently he is managing director of the biotech company Viziphar Biosciences BVBA, and member of the Board of Directors of Janssen Pharmaceutica and the VIB. He was succeeded as Chairman of FlandersBio by Johan Cardoen.

== Education ==
He obtained a degree of engineering in applied biological sciences and a PhD in agricultural sciences from the Katholieke Universiteit Leuven (Leuven, Belgium) and a law degree from the University of Antwerp (Antwerp, Belgium).

== Career ==
In 1972, he started his career at Janssen Pharmaceutica, as a scientist in the Department of Theoretical Medicinal Chemistry. After a year he moved to the Department of Patents and Pharmacochemical Data Processing of Janssen Pharmaceutica, and he headed the department from 1977 until 1989. Since 1987 continued his career as General Manager of Janssen Biotech, chairman of the management board of the Janssen Research Foundation (JRF) and from 1991 until 1999 as President of the Janssen Research Foundation and managing director of Janssen Pharmaceutica N.V. Until he retired, he was responsible for corporate venturing activities in Europe for Johnson & Johnson. In 2007 he founded Movetis together with Remi Van den Broeck, Dirk Reyn and Jan Schuurkes.

== Sources ==
- Staf Van Reet
- Europe's researchers ready for entrepreneurism
