= Frans Van den Bergh =

Frans, Baron Van den Bergh (1 May 1914 in Merksplas – 21 October 1990 in Turnhout) was a Belgian businessman, who founded the cigar factory Alto in Turnhout, Belgium, and who would become one of the leading managers of Janssen Pharmaceutica. In addition to his success with Alto, he was by the marriage of his daughter Lea related to Margriet Fleerackers, the mother of Dr. Paul Janssen. For these reasons, he was asked by the parents of Dr. Paul Janssen, Constant Janssen and Margriet Fleerackers, to help them manage the growing family business with its five branches.

In 1961, he became President of the Management Board of Janssen Pharmaceutica where he would stay until 1980, when he was succeeded by Baron Luc Wauters. He led the negotiations with Johnson & Johnson which resulted in the acquisition of Janssen Pharmaceutica in 1961. It was Frans Van den Bergh who suggested the name Janssen Pharmaceutica N.V. for the company, which was accepted by Dr. Paul Janssen, and this name has been in use since 10 February 1964.

Baron Van den Bergh would also been appointed by the Belgian government as the 6th chairman of the Belgian Nuclear Research Centre SCK CEN form 1975 until 1986.

== Sources ==
- Janssen Pharmaceutica
- In memoriam Dr. Paul Janssen
