= Metallo (disambiguation) =

Metallo is a supervillain appearing in DC Comics.

Metallo may also refer to:

- Metallo (Arrowverse Earth-X), a version of the character appearing in the Arrowverse
- "Metallo" (Lois & Clark episode), an episode of Lois & Clark: The New Adventures of Superman
- Metallo (Smallville character), the version of the character appearing in the TV series Smallville
- "Metallo" (Smallville episode), an episode of Smallville
- Metallo (The Batman), the version of the character appearing in the TV series The Batman
- Metallo-Chimique a Belgian metals and mining company
