= Cardoen =

Cardoen may refer to:

- Carlos Cardoen, a Chilean businessman and weapon scientist
- Johan Cardoen, Belgian biologist and businessman
