= Ortho-McNeil-Janssen =

Healthcare company of Johnson & Johnson

Ortho-McNeil-Janssen Pharmaceuticals, Inc is a healthcare company of Johnson & Johnson composed of two divisions:

- Ortho-McNeil, based in Raritan, NJ (United States); the division is focused on primary care.
- Janssen, based in Beerse (Belgium); formerly Janssen Pharmaceutica; the division is focused on mental health.

After some suits against Ortho-McNeil, Johnson & Johnson came to an agreement about the future of this subsidiary branch, now known as Janssen Pharmaceuticals.

== See also ==
- Biotech and pharmaceutical companies in the New York metropolitan area
