= Ajit Shetty =

Belgian businessman

Baron Ajit Shetty
- Born: Nellore, India
- Occupation: Businessman
- Known for: Chairman of the Board of Directors of Janssen Pharmaceutica

Ajit, Baron Shetty is a Belgian businessman. He was chairman of the board of directors of Janssen Pharmaceutica, a pharmaceutical company and subsidiary of Johnson & Johnson, with its headquarters in Beerse, Belgium. In February 2012 he retired. Shetty also served as a member of the Corporate Center Group Operating Committee and Vice President of Enterprise Supply Chain for Johnson & Johnson in New Brunswick, New Jersey.

== Education ==
A native of Mangalore, India, he grew up in Madras, Tamil Nadu; he attended Madras Christian College in Madras and graduated from Loyola College also in Madras. He received a B.A. degree in natural sciences and a PhD degree in metallurgy from Trinity College at Cambridge University. In 1976, he obtained an MSIA degree from Carnegie Mellon University.

== Career ==
He joined Janssen Pharmaceutica Inc. in 1976 and has held various positions in the company, including president of Janssen Pharmaceutica in Piscataway, New Jersey from 1986 until 1989 to establish the business in the US. He was managing director of Janssen Pharmaceutica from 1999 until 2008, and he was chairman of the board of directors from 2004, when he succeeded Bob Stouthuysen, until February 2012, when he retired. Most recently he was head of enterprise supply chain at Johnson & Johnson, reporting directly to CEO Bill Weldon. He has spent 36 years at Johnson & Johnson in varying capacities.

== Memberships ==
Shetty is a member of the board of directors of VOKA since April 2000, and a member of the board of directors of Forum 187 in Brussels since April 2006, and was elected as its chairman in May 2006. He is also a member of GS1 (Global Board of Governors, a global standards organization) in Belgium, a member of the Corporate Advisory Board of the Carey Business School at Johns Hopkins University in Baltimore and a member of the board of trustees of Carnegie Mellon University in Pittsburgh. In March 2017 Shetty was appointed to Actinium Pharmaceuticals' board of directors.

== Honors ==
He was elected Manager of the Year in 2004 in Flanders by the magazine Trends and the Flemish Management Association (VMA). In 2007, King Albert II of Belgium bestowed the title of Baron upon Shetty for his exceptional merits. In 2008 he earned an honorary doctorate from Manipal University. In February 2010 he received a lifetime achievement award in India. In March 2020 he received an honorary doctorate in pharmaceutical sciences from Ghent University.

== Sources ==
- Manager of the Year in 2004 (Janssen Pharmaceutica)
- Ajit Shetty (CMU)
