= Ortho-McNeil Pharmaceutical =

Pharmaceutical company

- Type: Subsidiary (of Johnson & Johnson)
- Industry: Medical equipment; Pharmaceutical
- Founded: Merger of Ortho Pharmaceutical & McNeil Pharmaceutical (1993; 33 years ago)
- Products: See list of Johnson & Johnson products
- Website: jnj.com

Ortho-McNeil Pharmaceutical (now operating under Janssen Pharmaceuticals) was a pharmaceutical company based in Raritan, New Jersey, that was formed from the merger of Ortho Pharmaceutical and McNeil Pharmaceutical in 1993. These pharmaceutical companies were pioneers and leaders in areas such as pain management, acid reflux disease, and infectious diseases.

Ortho-McNeil and Janssen Pharmaceuticals together composed the Ortho-McNeil-Janssen group within Johnson & Johnson before a decision to operate under the Janssen Pharmaceuticals name in 2011.

== Products ==
Amongst its many prescription drugs are:

- Ortho Tri-cyclen
- Ortho-Evra
- Doribax
- Elmiron
- Levaquin
- Ultram ER
- Aciphex
- Concerta

== Lawsuits ==
=== Topamax ===
==== False claims federal case ====
In 2010, Ortho-McNeil pled guilty in U.S. District Court to one count of misdemeanor violation of the Food, Drug & Cosmetic Act for illegally promoting its epilepsy drug Topamax for uses that were not approved by the FDA. The company was charged with using a program called "Doctor for a Day" to promote Topamax to psychiatrists for treatment of mental health conditions, despite never applying for FDA approval of Topamax for any psychiatric indication. The company was sentenced to pay a fine of $6.14 million.

Ortho-McNeil's parent company, Johnson and Johnson, also paid $75.37 million to resolve civil allegations under the False Claims Act that it caused false claims to be submitted to government health care programs for a variety of psychiatric uses that were not FDA approved.

==== Civil lawsuits ====
Ortho-McNeil was found liable in two 2013 civil suits by women who gave birth to children with birth defects after taking Topamax while pregnant. The jury found that they negligently failed to warn the patients and their doctors of the risks associated with Topamax when used by patients during pregnancy. They awarded $11 million in damages to one family and $4 million to the other.

As a result of these and other patient reports, the FDA ordered that a warning be added to the prescribing information for Topamax detailing the risk of birth defects such as cleft lip and cleft palate.

== See also ==
- Biotech and pharmaceutical companies in the New York metropolitan area
- Cilag
- Janssen Pharmaceutica
