= Eline Powell =

Belgian actress (born 1990)

- Born: Eline Pauwels; 12 April 1990 (age 36); Leuven, Belgium
- Occupation: Actress
- Years active: 2011–present
- Spouse: Lee Lennox
- Children: 1
- Father: Rudi Pauwels

Eline Powell (born Eline Pauwels, 12 April 1990) is a Belgian actress best known for playing the title role on the American TV series Siren.

== Early life ==
Powell is the daughter of Belgian pharmacologist Rudi Pauwels and clinical researcher Carine Claeys, who in 1994 were two of the co-founders of the biotech company Tibotec. She was born in Leuven and lived in Mechelen until she was fourteen years old. After a short stay in Switzerland, she moved to England, but she has Belgian citizenship and considers Belgium her home.

She attended the Royal Academy of Dramatic Arts, graduating in 2011 with a BA degree in acting.

== Career ==
Powell started her career in a short student film For Elsie, where she played the role of Mila, a mobster's daughter who wants to learn the piano in one day. Her performance earned awards from the Beijing Student Film Festival and the Student Academy Awards, USA; and the film's director, David Winstone, received the Foreign Film Gold Medal at the 39th Annual Student Academy Awards in 2012.

In 2012, she had a small role (Angelique) in Dustin Hoffman's directorial debut Quartet.

In 2014, Powell played the title role in the Italian drama film Anita B. directed by Roberto Faenza, for which the 2014 Capri, Hollywood International Film Festival named her that year's Breakout Actress. The Hollywood Reporter, on the other hand, criticized her performance as "ineffective.. failing to convey any traces of the suffering her character has obviously endured."

In 2016, she appeared in two episodes of Game of Thrones as Bianca, a young actress plotting to murder her rival.

She had small roles in Novitiate and King Arthur: Legend of the Sword, both released in 2017.

In August 2016, Powell was cast to star in the Freeform series Siren playing Ryn, a feral mermaid who comes to a small coastal village in search of her sister. To prepare for the role, Powell studied legends of mermaids and sea creatures. To develop ideas for the mermaid's body language, she worked from videos of marine and other predators. For the mermaid's newly learned speech, Powell was inspired by the accent of Icelandic singer Björk. She also worked with a free diver to learn monofin techniques for underwater swimming and fast turns.

Reviews of Siren were generally positive about Powell's performance, with IndieWire saying, "Powell's ability to embody a being who is mainly a physical presence, yet fill it with wonder, fear, and menace without uttering a word, is magnetic." The Tampa Bay Times praised her performance as one of "Siren's biggest strengths" (the other was its Pacific Northwest setting.) TV Guide, on the other hand, reviewing the pilot, complained that Powell "looks weird...performs the act of staring weird, as though she's trying with all her might to pop her eyeballs out of her head through sheer will."

Siren, which was the top new cable drama during spring 2018, was renewed in October for a second season, premiering on 24 January 2019.

== Personal life ==
In December 2018, Powell announced her engagement to British director and animator Lee Lennox. On July 10, 2021, they welcomed their first child, a daughter.

== Filmography ==
=== Film ===
Year	Title	Role	Notes	Refs.
2011	For Elsie	Mila (credited as "Eline Pauwels")	Short film	
2012	Quartet	Angelique		
2012	Private Peaceful	Anna		
2014	Anita B.	Anita		
2016	Stoner Express	Desiree	aka AmStarDam	
2017	Novitiate	Sister Candace		
2017	King Arthur: Legend of the Sword	Syren 2		

=== Television ===
Year	Title	Role	Notes	Refs.
2012	The Fear	Lule	Miniseries, 1 episode	
2016	Game of Thrones	Bianca	Episodes: "The Door" and "Blood of My Blood"	
2018–2020	Siren	Ryn Fisher	Lead role	
2024	A Man in Full	Sirja Tiramaki	3 episodes	
2024	Alex Rider	Syl	3 episodes	
