= Aravofloxacin =

Chemical compound

Clinical data
- Routes of administration: Oral, IV

Identifiers
- IUPAC name: 7-[(3E)-3-(2-Amino-1-fluoroethylidene)-1-piperidinyl]-1-cyclopropyl-6-fluoro-1,4-dihydro-8-methoxy-4-oxo-3-quinolinecarboxylic acid
- CAS Number: 878592-87-1
- ChemSpider: 9721013
- UNII: 070SV15RJA
- CompTox Dashboard (EPA): DTXSID20236667

Chemical and physical data
- Formula: C_{21}H_{23}F_{2}N_{3}O_{4}
- Molar mass: 419.429 g·mol^{−1}
- 3D model (JSmol): Interactive image
- SMILES: Fc1c(c(OC)c2c(c1)C(=O)C(\C(=O)O)=C/N2C3CC3)N4C/C(=C(/F)CN)CCC4
- InChI: InChI=InChI=1S/C21H23F2N3O4/c1-30-20-17-13(19(27)14(21(28)29)10-26(17)12-4-5-12)7-15(22)18(20)25-6-2-3-11(9-25)16(23)8-24/h7,10,12H,2-6,8-9,24H2,1H3,(H,28,29)/b16-11+; Key:VMKVDAAFMQKZJS-LFIBNONCSA-N

Aravofloxacin (JNJ-Q2) is a broad-spectrum fluoroquinolone antibacterial drug being developed for the treatment of acute bacterial skin and skin-structure infections and community-acquired pneumonia. Specifically, JNJ-Q2 is being actively studied for treatment of methicillin-resistant Staphylococcus aureus (MRSA) infections.

Furiex Pharmaceuticals has licensed JNJ-Q2 from Janssen Pharmaceutica, a unit of Johnson & Johnson, which discovered JNJ-Q2. Furiex is responsible for its development and commercialization. Both oral and intravenous formulations are being developed.

As of 2016, tests are ongoing.
