= Movetis =

Belgian pharmaceutical company

- Company type: Public company
- Founded: 2006
- Founders: Staf Van Reet, Remi Van den Broeck, Dirk Reyn, Jan Schuurkes, and Johnson & Johnson
- Defunct: 2010
- Fate: Acquired
- Successor: Shire (pharmaceutical company)
- Headquarters: Belgium
- Area served: Worldwide
- Key people: Staf Van Reet (CEO)
- Products: Gastro-intestinal drugs
- Website: www.movetis.com at the Wayback Machine (archived January 7, 2010)

Movetis was a pharmaceutical company headquartered in Belgium. It was founded in 2006 as a spin-off from parent company Johnson & Johnson. The company specialized in pharmaceuticals for treating gastro-intestinal disorders. It was acquired by Shire in 2010.

The primary drug produced by Movetis was Prucalopride (known by the brand name "Resolor"), indicated for cases of chronic constipation.

== History ==
Movetis was founded by Dirk Reyn, Staf Van Reet, Jan schuurkes and Remi VandenBroek, and was backed by venture firms Sofinnova Partners, Sofinnova Ventures and Life Sciences Partners. In December 2009, it became a public company with an IPO on the New York Stock Exchange's Euronext. Shortly thereafter, it gained regulatory approval to distribute Resolor in 30 European countries.

In 2010, the company was acquired by British drugmaker Shire Plc for 428 million euros ($559 million).
