= Innerstate =

- Directed by: Chris Valentino
- Produced by: Chris Valentino
- Starring: Jason Knott, Ray Ciccarelli, Janie Feliz
- Release date: 2007
- Country: USA

Innerstate is a 2007 documentary film on the "inner states" of three adults living with chronic diseases of the immune system: psoriasis, Crohn's disease, and rheumatoid arthritis. The film was produced and directed by Chris Valentino and was funded by Centocor Inc., a biomedicines company. According to the New York Times, the film is "an unusual form of soft-pedal marketing of a blockbuster drug, Remicade". Remicade (Infliximab) is a medication used to treat autoimmune diseases made by Centocor, a unit of Johnson & Johnson.

== Production ==
The New York Times hypothesized that Innerstate was probably the first film to be both originated by and entirely funded by a drug company, although previously drug companies had helped fund other documentaries on diseases. Despite this, the film does not mention Centocor or Remicade. Not mentioning the drug means it does not have to conform to strict U.S. Food and Drug Administration (FDA) regulations that require detailed explanation of the health risks of therapies.

== Synopsis ==
The film's subjects are Jason Knott, diagnosed with psoriasis, Janie Feliz, diagnosed with rheumatoid arthritis, and Ray Ciccarelli, diagnosed with Crohn's disease, all diseases of the immune system, which may be characterized by immune deregulation, chronic inflammation and tissue damage.

Through the film's progression, first-hand accounts are intertwined to show how Jason, Janie and Ray, people with different illnesses and from different backgrounds, are linked by their illnesses. Each subject is introduced individually, their stories of diagnosis, treatment and living, told first-person as well as by friends, family and physicians. Although the film was funded by a pharmaceutical company, the participants were not paid.

== Promotion ==
The film was promoted through doctors' offices, and then presented through online screenings. There were also 14 theatrical screenings that included live question and answer sessions with doctors.

== Reception ==
Innerstate premiered on February 21, 2007, at the Directors Guild of America Theater in New York, NY.

The National Psoriasis Association approved of the film, calling it "a great way to get the word out about the disease" and "fair and balanced". They had previously distributed a film, My Skin's on Fire by Fred Finkelstein, which was part-financed by another pharmaceutical company, Genentech.
