= Blake Ritson =

English actor, film director, screenwriter (born 1978)

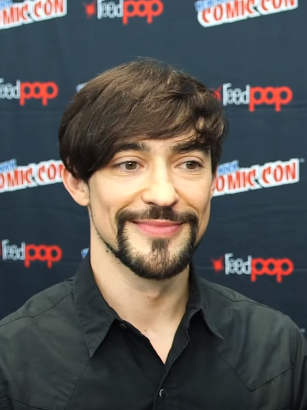
- Blake Ritson at New York Comic-Con (2014)
- Born: Blake Adam Ritson; 14 January 1978 (age 48); London, England, U.K.
- Education: Dolphin School; St Paul's School
- Alma mater: Jesus College, Cambridge
- Occupations: Actor, director, screenwriter
- Years active: 1996–present
- Spouse: Hattie Morahan
- Children: 2

Blake Adam Ritson (born 14 January 1978) is an English actor, film director, and screenwriter.

== Early life and education ==
Ritson was born on 14 January 1978 in London and attended the Dolphin School in Reading, Berkshire, until 1993, before going to St Paul's School in West London on an academic scholarship. He then attended Jesus College, Cambridge, where he studied English and medieval Italian, graduating in 2000. While a student he acted on both stage and screen, playing Paul Etheridge in White Chameleon, Fleance in Macbeth, and Augustus in Tom Stoppard's Arcadia (1996) at the National Theatre in productions directed by Richard Eyre and Trevor Nunn.

== Career ==
=== Acting ===
Ritson is known in recent years for playing King Edward III in the television miniseries World Without End (2012), the Duke of Kent in Upstairs Downstairs (2010–2012), Mr Elton in the 2009 BBC adaptation of Emma, Edmund Bertram in the 2007 ITV adaptation of Mansfield Park, Giles Vicary in the BBC series Red Cap and for portraying sidekick Robert Presley in A Touch of Frost. He also played the part of Justin in The League of Gentlemen, Idek in God on Trial, and the comic lead in For Elsie, which he also co-produced. He also portrayed the main antagonist in David Goyer's Da Vinci's Demons (2013).

In 2013, Ritson appeared as Colonel Brandon in Helen Edmundson's BBC Radio 4 adaptation of Sense and Sensibility. in 2020, he starred in the Big Finish reboot of cult adventure series Adam Adamant Lives!. He had lent his voice to several other productions for the company.

In 2022, Ritson starred as Oscar Van Rhijn in The Gilded Age series on HBO.

=== Film directing and screenwriting ===
Ritson writes and directs with his brother, Dylan. The brothers first directed the short film Out of Time. Starring Mark Heap and Raquel Cassidy, the film won the Global Audience Award at the first CON-CAN Movie Festival and was runner up at Minimalen and the Berlin Film Festival. It also screened at the London, São Paulo and Dresden film festivals.

Their second short film, More More More, starring The League of Gentlemen's Mark Gatiss, was a runner-up in the Turner Classic Movies Competition.

Their third film, shot in 2009, is entitled Love Hate, and stars Ben Whishaw and Hayley Atwell. It was chosen for the Edinburgh International Film Festival, Palm Springs Film Festival, London BFI Film Festival, Foyle, Omaha, Encounters, Berkshire International Film Festival, Sofia Film Fest (Bulgaria), Tofifest International Film Festival (Poland), West Hollywood International, LA Shorts Fest and Short Shorts Film Festival (Japan). It won the Jury Award at the Palm Springs International Shortsfest and won the Best International Short award at the Cinema St. Louis Film Festival.

The Ritson brothers have also shot a fourth short film, Good Boy, starring Jessica Hynes (née Stevenson), Reece Shearsmith, Nicholas Burns, Joanna Page and Blake Ritson's then-fiancée Hattie Morahan.

The Ritson brothers were selected for the front cover of Screen International magazine's Stars of Tomorrow 2009.

== Personal life ==
Ritson is married to actress Hattie Morahan, whom he met at university. They have a daughter, born in 2016, and a son, born in 2020.

Ritson played the banjolele on Douglas Hodge's 2006 album Cowley Road Songs, which was recorded in four days at the Blue Moon Studios in Banbury. He describes the banjolele as "a hybrid instrument between a ukulele and a banjo; teamed up with the kazoo it's a winning combination".

== Filmography ==
=== Film ===
| Year | Film | Role | Notes |
|---|---|---|---|
| 1996 | Different for Girls | Young Prentice | |
| 1999 | Titus | Mutius | |
| 2001 | Me Without You | Tim | |
| 2002 | AKA | Alexander Gryffoyn | |
| 2008 | RocknRolla | Johnny Sloane | |
| 2009 | Dead Man Running | Jarvis | |
| 2011 | For Elsie | Glenn | Short film |
| 2012 | Hyde Park on Hudson | Butler | |
| 2014 | Serena | Lowenstein | |
| 2021 | Hitman's Wife's Bodyguard | Gunther | |

=== Television ===
| Year | Film | Role | Notes |
|---|---|---|---|
| 1996 | No Bananas | Pete | Episode: "Blitz" |
| 1996 | Breaking the Code | Christopher Morcom | Television film |
| 1997–1998 | Knight School | Sir Roger de Courcey | 3 episodes |
| 1999 | Shooting the Past | Nick | 3 episodes |
| 2000 | The League of Gentlemen | Justin Smart | 2 episodes |
| 2001 | London's Burning | Dermot | 2 episodes |
| 2001 | Urban Gothic | Dave Matthews | Episode: "The End" |
| 2001 | Red Cap | Lt. Giles Vicary | Television film |
| 2003 | Adventure Inc. | Byron Haycroft | Episode: "Angel of St. Edmunds" |
| 2003–2004 | Red Cap | Giles Vicary | 12 episodes |
| 2005 | If... | Ben Swales | Episode: "If...We Stopped Giving Aid to Africa" |
| 2005 | Strauss: The Waltz King | Older Johann Strauss II | Television film |
| 2005 | The Bill | Gavin Murray | Episode: "Honour" |
| 2006 | Casualty | Daniel Tasker | Episode: "Worlds Apart" |
| 2006 | The Inspector Lynley Mysteries | Graham Marshall | Episode: "Chinese Walls" |
| 2006 | A Touch of Frost | D.C. Robert Presley | Episode: "Endangered Species" |
| 2007 | Mansfield Park | Edmund Bertram | Television film |
| 2007 | The Commander: The Devil You Know | John Littlewood | Television film |
| 2008 | God on Trial | Idek | Television film |
| 2009 | Emma | Mr. Elton | 4 episodes |
| 2010–2012 | Upstairs Downstairs | The Duke of Kent | 8 episodes |
| 2011 | The Crimson Petal and the White | Bodley | 3 episodes |
| 2011 | The Romantics | Percy Bysshe Shelley | Episode: "Eternity |
| 2011 | Doctor Who: The Lost Stories | Instructor Shibac (voice) | Episode: "The Foe from the Future" |
| 2011 | Garrow's Law | Charles Fox | Episode #3.4 |
| 2012 | World Without End | King Edward III | 8 episodes |
| 2013–2015 | Da Vinci's Demons | Girolamo Riario | 26 episodes |
| 2015 | The Embrace | Dan | 5 episodes |
| 2016 | Indian Summers | Charlie Havistock | 10 episodes |
| 2016 | Hooten & the Lady | Yannaras | Episode: "Egypt" |
| 2018–2019 | Krypton | Brainiac | 20 episodes |
| 2019 | Endeavour | Gabriel Van Horne | Episode: "Apollo" |
| 2022–present | The Gilded Age | Oscar Van Rhijn | 25 episodes |
| 2022–2023 | The Crown | Andrew Gailey | 4 episodes |
| 2024 | The Count of Monte Cristo | Danglars | 7 episodes |
| 2024 | Interview with the Vampire | Morgan Ward | Episode: "What Can the Damned Really Say to the Damned" |
| 2025 | Foundation | Sunmaster-18 | Season 3 |

=== Stage ===
- Rope – Brandon (Almeida, dir. Roger Michell)
- Tender – (Donmar Warehouse, dir. Seth Sklar-Heyn)
- Violet – Mio (Royal Court, dir. Indu Rubasingham)
- Love Is Blind – Manolito Trevelez (Royal Court, dir. Nathalie Abrahami)
- The Importance of Being Earnest – Jack Worthing (ADC Theatre, 1999, dir. Phillip Breen)
- Arcadia – Septimus (Bristol Old Vic, dir. Rachel Kavanaugh)
- HappyTime Park – Xavier (Riverside Studios, devised and dir. Dylan Ritson)
- In Praise of Love – Joey (Theatre Royal Bath, dir. Deborah Bruce)
- Arcadia – Augustus (Theatre Royal Haymarket, – National Theatre/Michael Codron – dir. Trevor Nunn)
- Macbeth – Fleance (National Theatre, Olivier, dir. Richard Eyre)
- White Chameleon – Paul Etheridge (National Theatre, Cottesloe, dir. Richard Eyre)
- The Luke Files – Bartholomew (RT Productions, dir. Paul McKusker)
- Romeo and Juliet – Benvolio (Immersive, dir. Mark Rosenblatt)

=== Radio and audio drama ===
- The War of the Worlds – Robert (BBC Radio 4, dir. Marc Beeby)
- Publish and be Damn'd – Argyle (BBC Radio 4, Ellen Dryden)
- The Go-Between – Hugh Trimingham (BBC Radio 3, Matt Thompson)
- Gods And Monsters – Hurmzid (Big Finish, Ken Bentley)
- The Diary of Samuel Pepys – Edward Montagu (BBC Radio 4, Kate McAll)
- Doctor Who – Foe from the Future – Shibac (Big Finish, Ken Bentley)
- Freud: The Case Histories: The Wolf Man – Sergei Pankejeff (BBC Radio 4, Nadia Molinari)
- Richard II – Henry Bolingbroke (BBC Radio 4, Jessica Dromgoole and Jeremy Mortimer)
- Money – Evelyn (BBC Radio 3, Samuel West)
- The American Senator – John Morton (BBC Radio 4, Tracey Neale)
- Poetry Please – Various Roles (BBC Radio 4, Christine Hall)
- Death in Genoa – Dr. Carlo Bazzani (Independent Drama, written Thomas Wright)
- The Absolutist – Reader (BBC Book at Bedtime, dir. Heather Larmour)
- Saint Joan – Charles (BBC Radio 3, dir. Jonquil Panting)
- Sunk – Bert Selphin (BBC Radio 4, dir. Gemma McMullan)
- Leverage – David (BBC Radio 4, dir. Sasha Yevtushenko)
- A Month in the Country – Moon (BBC Radio 4, dir. David Hunter)
- The Far Pavilions – Ash (BBC Radio 4, dir. Jessica Dromgoole and Marc Beeby)
- With Great Pleasure – Reader (BBC Radio 4, dir. Christine Hall)
- The Ordeals of Sherlock Holmes – Christopher Thrale (Big Finish, Ken Bentley)
- Aunts Aren't Gentlemen – Reader (BBC Radio 4, Mark Beeby & Emma Harding)
- Billions – Mark (BBC Radio 4, Jonquil Panting)
- The Barchester Chronicles – Crosbie (BBC Radio 4, Gary Brown)
- The Shadow of Dorian Gray – John Gray (BBC Radio 4, Abigail Le Fleming)
- Bonnie Prince Charlie – Charles Edward Stuart (BBC Radio 4, Sasha Yevtushenko)
- The Trespasser's Guide to the Classics – Dorian Gray (BBC Radio 4, Sasha Yevtushenko)
- Artist Descending a Staircase – Beauchamp (BBC Radio 3, Gordon House)
- Two on a Tower – Swithin St.Cleeve (BBC Radio 4, dir. Stefan Escreet)
- Vincent Price and the Horror of the English Blood Beast – (BBC Radio 4, dir. Sam Hoyle)
- The Wings of the Dove – (BBC Radio 4, dir. Nadia Molinari)
- The Killing – (BBC Radio 4, dir. Sasha Yevtushenko)
- The Man Who Shot the 60s – (BBC4, dir. Linda Brusasco)
- The Embrace – Dan (BBC Radio 4, dir. Nadia Molinari)
- Sense and Sensibility – Colonel Brandon – (BBC Radio 4, adapted by Helen Edmundson)
- Six Windows of the Muslim World – (Crescent Films, dir. Ned Williams)
- Adam Adamant Lives! Volume 01: A Vintage Year for Scoundrels – Adam Adamant (Big Finish, written by Guy Adams)
- The Divine Comedy – Dante the Poet (BBC Radio 4, dir. Stephen Wyatt)
- Enduring Love – Joe (BBC Radio 4, dir. Amber Barnfather)

=== Video games ===
- Dragon Quest VIII: Journey of the Cursed King – Angelo
- Harry Potter and The Goblet of Fire – Cedric Diggory
- Killzone: Liberation – Colonel Cobar
- Xenoblade Chronicles – Alvis
- Dark Souls – Griggs of Vinheim
- Final Fantasy XIV – Aymeric
- El Shaddai: Ascension of the Metatron – Enoch
- The Last Story – Jirall, additional voices
- Soul Sacrifice – Magusar
- Dark Souls II – Royal Sorcerer Navlaan
- The Order: 1886 – Additional voices
- Dark Souls III – Hawkwood the Deserter
- Xenoblade Chronicles 3: Future Redeemed – Alpha
- Lies of P Overture - the Tracker

== Awards and nominations ==
| Year | Association | Category | Project | Result | Ref. |
|---|---|---|---|---|---|
| 2023 | Screen Actors Guild Awards | Outstanding Performance by an Ensemble in a Drama Series | The Gilded Age | Nominated | |
