= Jan Schuurkes =

Jan A. J. Schuurkes (born 1950, in Oisterwijk) is a Dutch pharmacologist and gastrointestinal researcher.

== Education ==
He graduated as a biochemist at the Catholic University of Nijmegen (Nijmegen). He obtained a PhD in Medicine at Utrecht University (Utrecht) with a thesis on Motility and hemodynamics of the canine gastrointestinal tract.

== Career ==
In 1979, he started his career at Janssen Pharmaceutica, where he became assistant head of the Department of Pharmacodynamics, head of the Department of Gastrointestinal pharmacology and finally vice-president Gastrointestinal Discovery. In 2007, he founded a new pharmaceutical company, Movetis.

== Awards ==
- 1997, Dr. Paul Janssen award.

== Sources ==
- Alarm in de darm BW
