= For Elsie (film) =

- Directed by: David Winstone
- Written by: Vincent Klueger
- Produced by: Peter Hort, Gemma Priggen, Olegar Fedoro, Blake Ritson
- Starring: Blake Ritson, Olegar Fedoro, Eline Powell, Caroline Blakiston
- Cinematography: Joseph Kelly Jones
- Edited by: Patrick Shead-Simmonds
- Music by: Gregory John Madge
- Release date: 16 June 2011
- Running time: 23 minutes
- Country: United Kingdom
- Language: English / Russian

For Elsie is a short film (23 minutes) written by Vincent Klueger and directed by David Winstone.

Released in 2011 by University of Westminster, the film was a Gold Medal winner at The 39th Annual Student Academy Awards. The ceremony was held in June 2012 at the Academy's Samuel Goldwyn Theatre in Beverly Hills, CA. Hence For Elsie became eligible for the Oscars 2013 in the Short Film category.

== Plot ==
The film is a dark comedy about a disillusioned piano teacher Glenn (Blake Ritson), who once aspired to be a concert pianist. He is moving back to his parents' house and is on the brink of giving up the piano for good when a Russian gangster Kilov (Olegar Fedoro) offers him a unique opportunity: £10,000 if Glenn successfully teaches in just a day Beethoven's Für Elise to Kilov's daughter Mila (Eline Powell), who has never played piano. If Mila's visiting grandmother, who thinks she's been studying piano for two years, won't be pleased with the result, Kilov threatens to break Glenn's hands.

== Cast ==
- Blake Ritson - Glenn Milberg
- Olegar Fedoro - Sergei Kilov
- Eline Powell - Mila Kilov (as Eline Pauwels)
- Caroline Blakiston - Mama Kilov
- Tom Marshall - Mickey
- Mark Fox - Bodyguard 1
- Martin Webbe - Bodyguard 2

== Accolades ==
- 2011 - The Student Best Fiction Award at Royal Television Society, UK.
- 2012 - The Audience Award at Manchester Exposures Student Film and Moving Image Festival.
- 2012 - Honorable Mention at Next Reel International Film Festival in Singapore.
- 2012 - The Audience Award at VGIK International Student Festival in Moscow, Russia.
- 2012 - The Bronze Award at the International Student Film and Video Festival of Beijing Film Academy.
- 2012 - 39th Student Oscar Awards - Foreign Film (Gold Medal): David Winstone

== Reviews ==
- University of Westminster Review
- Review in Cassone Art
- Review in Ticket Stubs Entertainment
- Review in Birthplace of Cinema
- Review in Student Academy Awards
