= Johnson & Johnson Pharmaceutical Research and Development =

Johnson & Johnson Pharmaceutical Research and Development (J&JPRD) is part of Johnson & Johnson Innovative Medicine business segment. It is responsible for discovering and developing pharmaceutical drugs. J&JPRD has research sites located in Raritan, New Jersey, Titusville, New Jersey, Spring House, Pennsylvania, La Jolla, California, Beerse, Belgium and Toledo, Spain.

J&JPRD was created in 2001 through the merging of various research organizations including McNeil Pharmaceuticals, Janssen Research Foundation, Three Dimensional Pharmaceuticals, and the R. W. Johnson Pharmaceutical Research Institute.

== Research Collaborative ==
In addition to internal research and development activities J&JPRD is also involved in publicly funded collaborative research projects, with other industrial and academic partners. One example in the area of non-clinical safety assessment is the InnoMed PredTox. The company is expanding its activities in joint research projects within the framework of the Innovative Medicines Initiative of EFPIA and the European Commission.
