= Glacio =

Glacio NV is a Belgian ice cream producer based in Beerse, Belgium. It mostly focuses its business activities on ice cream specialties. In February 2013 Glacio took over the Belgian Icecream Group.

== History ==
Glacio's origins date back to 1972 when a production facility was built to produce ice cream for the door-to-door and gastronomy market under the brand name Pinti.

In 1983 Schöller GmbH takes over Pinti and starts production in Beerse under the Mövenpick brand name. Schöller transforms its Belgian production plant in 1996 to the European Centre of Expertise, which further specializes in small and diversified production volumes for the gastronomy and door-to-door market segments.

In 2000 a Japanese subsidiary is founded under the name Schöller Japan Frozen Foods KK.

Only a year later, in 2001, the Schöller Holding is taken over by Nestle S.A. The production plant in Beerse contributes to the reinforcement of Nestlé's presence in the European gastronomy market.

Through a Management buyout, the management takes over the company and its subsidiaries from Nestlé in 2003. From 1 January 2004 onwards, the firm is known as Glacio NV. The company expands in 2011 by starting up a sales office in France.

In 2012, the German DMK Group acquires 1/3 of Glacio's shares, which leads to a deepening of relationships between the two businesses.

In the same year Glacio founds its Hong Kong office to support its growth in Asian markets.

10 years after the MBO, in 2013, CEO's Peter Janssen and Werner Van Springel decide to take over the Belgian Icecream Group, which has a strong presence on the Belgian ice cream market with the IJsboerke brand.

In 2013 Glacio opens its first ice cream shop in the K11 mall in Hong Kong.

== Products ==
Glacio ice cream products are distributed throughout the world as a typical European style of ice cream. Its assortment comes in several traditional European flavors such as Belgian chocolate and Rote Grütze, a typical German flavor. Glacio ice cream is marketed as a "super-premium" brand. Glacio mainly provides ice cream products for the foodservice, home delivery and retail channel. The company focuses on production of value adding artisan products, produced on an industrial scale.

In 2012, superstar Madonna asked her manager to fly over some of Glacio's ice cream delicacies to Moscow, after tasting them on her tour in Belgium.

== Selected awards ==
- In the year 2005 Glacio is rewarded with the Grand gold medal by Monde Selection for its product ‘Temptations Ice Pralines’.
- In 2013 Glacio wins a ‘preferred supplier’ award from Nestlé Germany, being one of Nestlé's top-20 suppliers amongst the more than 16.000 of the world's largest food company.
