= Vlimmeren =

Village in Belgium

Coordinates: 51°17′50″N 4°46′55″E

Coat of arms of Vlimmeren

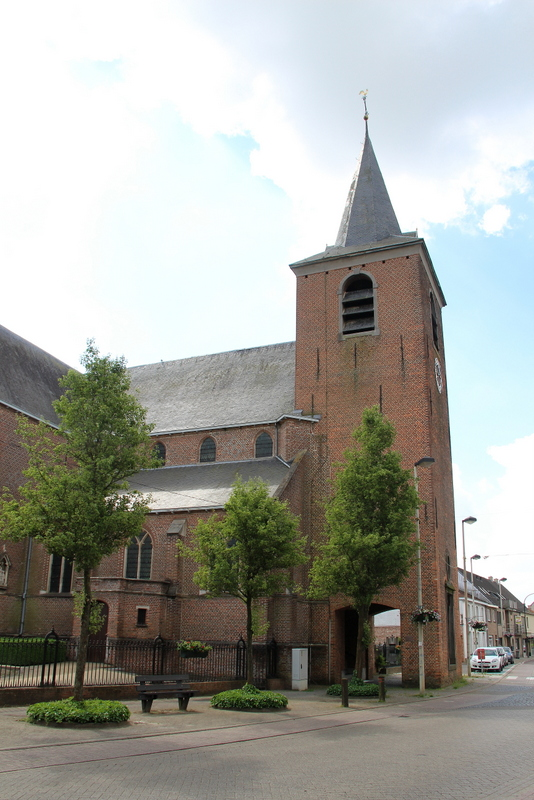
Church in Vlimmeren

Vlimmeren is a village in the Belgian Antwerp Province and is a submunicipality of Beerse. It was an independent municipality until 1977. It covers an area of 943 ha (2,330 acres) and had 2450 inhabitants.

The village is nicknamed Stad Worst (translated: City Sausage).

== History ==
It is an ancient village, said to have been inhabited by the Salian Franks, later part of the Duchy of Brabant.
