= Bernhard Joos (chemist) =

Swiss chemist

Bernhard Joos (18 December 1899 Schaffhausen, Switzerland – 8 June 1990 Paradiso, Switzerland), was the son of Dr. Bernhard Joos and Olga Sturzenegger.

He attained a PhD in chemistry at the University of Zurich in 1925, and was an assistant of Paul Karrer, who won the Nobel Prize in Chemistry in 1937. After a stay in the US, Joos returned to Switzerland in 1932 and started his own laboratory, where he discovered the analgesic properties of phenazopyridine (later branded as Pyridazil).

In 1936 he created the pharmaceutical company Cilag (Chemical Industrial Laboratory AG). Within its first few years the new company launched six new pharmaceutical preparations. Joos left the company in 1949, and in 1959 Cilag was acquired by the US company Johnson & Johnson.

An Australian legal claim filed by him, Bernhard Joos vs. Commissioner of Patents, resulted in a change in British patent law, making medical and cosmetic procedures on the human body patentable.
