= Anita B. =

2014 film by Roberto Faenza

- Directed by: Roberto Faenza
- Written by: Edith Bruck; Roberto Faenza; Nelo Risi; Iole Masucci; Hugh Fleetwood
- Cinematography: Arnaldo Catinari
- Music by: Paolo Buonvino
- Release date: 16 January 2014
- Running time: 88 minutes
- Language: English

Anita B. is a 2014 Italian drama film directed by Roberto Faenza. It is loosely based on the 2009 autobiographic novel Quanta stella c'è nel cielo (How Many Stars Twinkle in the Sky) by Edith Bruck.

== Plot ==
It is 1945, World War II has just ended, and Anita, a 16-year-old Hungarian Jewish girl who survived Auschwitz but was orphaned, is taken in by her paternal aunt Monika in Zvíkovské, Czechoslovakia.

Anita now lives with her aunt, her uncle Aron, their infant son Roby, and Eli, Aron's brother and then Monika's brother-in-law in a house confiscated by the Czechoslovak government from Germans expelled from the country after the war.

But Anita is immediately treated coldly by Monika, who forbids her to talk about her experience in the concentration camp. She is also forbidden to leave the house, as the girl is undocumented. Nevertheless, invited by her aunt and uncle who trust in the confusion, she attends a party one evening. Here two policemen, realizing that she is a Hungarian, discover that she is not in good standing and arrest her. Imprisoned, she is freed when, a few days later, she obtains her papers.

Days pass and Anita begins working in a tailor's shop, where she befriends David. Meanwhile, a troubled romance begins between Anita and Eli. One day, Anita discovers that she is pregnant: she would like to confide in David, but the young man has left for Jerusalem. When she reveals her status to Eli, the man reacts badly and decides to take her lover to Prague to have her aborted. Anita is reluctant, but follows him to Prague, as she believes she is in love with him.

At the time of the procedure, the doctor realizes that Anita would like to keep the baby and gives her a sedative to simulate anesthesia. He then dismisses her by handing back to her the money shelled out by Eli for the abortion. Anita returns with Eli to their hotel room and he leaves, locking her inside. Anita, finally realizing that she is unloved by Eli, escapes by jumping from the balcony and reaches the city's Jewish reception center, where she knows that trips are being arranged to Marseilles, and then sails to Palestine. The young girl finally manages to leave with other Jewish boys to reach Jerusalem, where David is, and, on the truck that will take her to Marseille, she travels serenely to her people's past with only one piece of luggage: the future.

== Cast ==
- Eline Powell: Anita
- Robert Sheehan: Eli
- Andrea Osvárt: Monica
- Antonio Cupo: Aron
- Nico Mirallegro: David
- Moni Ovadia: Uncle Jacob
- Jane Alexander: Sarah
