= Ambucetamide =

Chemical compound

Clinical data
- ATC code: none

Identifiers
- IUPAC name: 2-(dibutylamino)-2-(4-methoxyphenyl)acetamide
- CAS Number: 519-88-0
- PubChem CID: 10616
- ChemSpider: 10171
- UNII: 131B408RZI
- ChEMBL: ChEMBL2104638
- CompTox Dashboard (EPA): DTXSID4057760
- ECHA InfoCard: 100.007.527

Chemical and physical data
- Formula: C_{17}H_{28}N_{2}O_{2}
- Molar mass: 292.423 g·mol^{−1}
- 3D model (JSmol): Interactive image
- SMILES: O=C(N)C(c1ccc(OC)cc1)N(CCCC)CCCC
- InChI: InChI=1S/C17H28N2O2/c1-4-6-12-19(13-7-5-2)16(17(18)20)14-8-10-15(21-3)11-9-14/h8-11,16H,4-7,12-13H2,1-3H3,(H2,18,20); Key:WUSAVCGXMSWMQM-UHFFFAOYSA-N

Ambucetamide is an antispasmodic found to be particularly effective for the relief of menstrual pain. It was discovered in 1953 by Paul Janssen.
