= Metallo-Chimique =

Belgian refiner, recycler, and supplier of tin, lead, and copper

- Industry: copper
- Founded: 1919
- Headquarters: Beerse, Belgium
- Parent: Metallum Holding
- Website: metallo.com

Metallo-Chimique International N.V., based in Beerse, Belgium, also described simply as Metallo, is a privately held metals and mining company. The company was incorporated in 1919. Metallo now specializes in the recycling and refining of metalliferous materials (e.g. copper, tin, lead, zinc, as well as cable, waste from the electronics sector, car catalysts, and the like), to produce pure tin and lead, electrolytic copper, copper anodes and solder from a wide variety of scrap and residues.

The company produces approximately 10,000 tons of cu-anodes, 1,500 tons of lead-ingots and 800 tons of tin-ingots per month. It is the leading producer of pure tin in Europe. All Metallo-Chimique final products are made out of scrap and by-products. The company buys and processes a wide range of different scrap grades and qualities including complex materials such as ashes, slags, oxides, and sludges. Due to this what it describes as "this unique situation", Metallo-Chimique sources its raw materials from all over the world.
