= Precision diagnostics =

Precision diagnostics is a branch of precision medicine that involves managing a patient's healthcare model and diagnosing specific diseases based on omics data analytics.

The U.S. announced federal funding for precision medicine research efforts in 2015 with the Precision Medicine Initiative. A year later, the Human Personal Omics Profiling study was established to develop integrative multi-omics approaches for use in precision diagnostics.

Individuals receive an early disease diagnosis based on their variability in DNA, environment, and lifestyle. Precision diagnostics utilize recent technological advancements in the acquisition of data from genomics, transcriptomics, epigenomics, proteomics, metabolomics, and microbiome. It helps gain a comprehensive understanding of an individual's personal molecular profile by monitoring collateral molecular layers.

Furthermore, modern computing improves the analysis of the omics data generated. Precision diagnostics utilizes advancements in artificial intelligence, specifically convolutional neural networks and data analysis, to predict the relationship between genotype and phenotype, potentially enhancing the sensitivity and specificity of precision diagnoses.

The advancement of next-generation sequencing (NGS) has improved cancer diagnostics. NGS provides a more comprehensive view of the genome than other single-gene assays. NGS-based molecular diagnostics give genomic information about tumor-related variants and structural changes that cause cancer. This lets doctors make very accurate diagnoses and use targeted therapies that work with them. NGS samples can be collected using a buccal swab, peripheral blood, or tissue-specific biopsy, and DNA is used to screen for single nucleotide variants, gene insertions and deletions and copy number variants, while RNA is used to measure gene expression.

== Precision diagnostics techniques ==
=== DNA sequencing ===
DNA sequencing is an essential component of modern scientific translational research, and the use of DNA sequencing in the clinical environment was introduced first in clinical oncology. Whole genome sequencing is used extensively for cancer patients. It is used to help give further genetic information about the patient's background as well as their eligibility for clinical trials that may be beneficial to them. The advantage of using WGS is that it reduces overall cost and time for the clinic to pass the diagnostics stage and apply treatments for the patient. Genetic sequencing can also be performed later on when a patient's disease progresses. Furthermore, using germline data, clinical may evaluate cancer predisposition and pharmacogenomics information for earlier cancer identification and treatment. Despite some challenges, such as accessibility to lower-income patients, healthcare systems around the world have started to invest into holistic genomic sequencing and data infrastructure. The importance of fast access to the high-dimensional output of genomic data is growing.

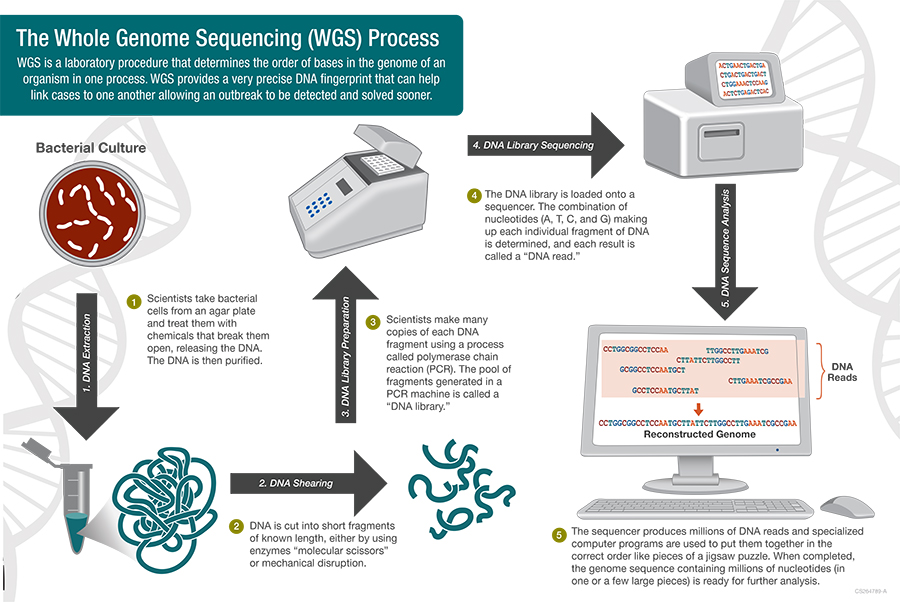
Example workflow of whole genome sequencing

=== RNA sequencing ===
Single-cell RNA sequencing and dual host-pathogen RNA sequencing are some of the commercially available RNA sequencing technologies. RNA-Seq allows clinicians to trace cancers when other diagnostic results are ambiguous. RNA sequencing allows further cell trajectory analysis that may give additional insight into cancer subtypes and patient backgrounds. As a more advanced version of whole genome sequencing, RNA sequencing gives additional information when creating an individual patient's treatment plan. The importance of RNA sequencing in the diagnostics of malignant disorders, such as leukoplakia, is increasing. Transcriptome analysis may also reveal disease progression in pro-malignant conditions. Such analysis allows for an individualized prognosis for each patient. The utilities for the sequencing of blood, bone marrow, or other bodily systems are becoming increasingly obvious. Using the database, clinicians may become more informed of the patient's situation.

=== Proteomics ===
Proteomics is the study of proteins. Proteins that are translated from messenger RNA go through post-transcriptional modifications that include phosphorylation, ubiquitination, methylation, acetylation, glycosylation, etc. Previously, immunoassay methods were used to study proteins, but mass spectrometry is now mainly used as a proteomic analyzing tool. In mass spectrometry analysis, proteins/peptides are fragmented. Then, peptides are ionized through either electrospray ionization or matrix-assisted laser desorption/ionization (MALDI). In addition to this, a mass analyzer generates information-rich ion mass spectra from fragmented peptides. Four types of mass analyzers include ion trap, time-of-flight, quadrupole, and Fourier transform ion cyclotron. Lastly, using computational bioinformatics tools and algorithms, collected proteomics data can be further analyzed and used for protein profiling.

=== Microbiome ===
In recent years, the interest in microbiome research has been rising and has become one of the critical components in precision medicine. Microbiome research refers to the studying of microorganisms' interaction within and outside of the host. Common microorganisms include different types of fungi, bacteria, and viruses, and the community of microorganisms is known as the microbiome. These microorganisms exist in most of our body parts, contributing to our health. According to research, this microbiome is crucial in regulating our physiology by altering our metabolism, immune system, and more. Hence, the changes in the microbial community can provide insights into the health condition of the specific host and patient. In precision medicine, patients' gut microbiome is often profiled in order to determine which treatment offers the most therapeutic value to them. Evidence shows that the microbiome is essential as it may increase the effectiveness of specific cancer treatments.

== Diagnostics in specific disease conditions ==
=== Genomic sequencing in lymphoma diagnostics ===
With recent advancements in genome sequencing and the identification of mutations linking toward diagnosing lymphoma, more effect has been put into identifying key mutations and genetic aberrations to aid precision diagnostics for Lymphoma patients. Most lymphoma identities may be characterized by chromosome translocations, for example, follicular lymphoma (FL) t(14;18), diffuse large B cell lymphoma (DLBCL) t(8;14), and anaplastic large cell lymphoma (ALCL) t(2;5). Though these translocations are useful for identifying lymphoma entities, translocations are not unique to each type of lymphoma. For instance, FL and DLBCL share translations of the 8th and 14th chromosomes. To address this problem, low-throughput and low-resolution methods such as Sanger sequencing and fluorescence in situ hybridization (FISH) is used alongside commercial probes to detect translocation on desired chromosomes. Despite the mutational landscape of multiple lymphomas being highly heterogenous, large-scale sequencing projects using higher definition resolution revealed more key mutations in different lymphomas. Next-generation sequencing (NGS) revealed several essential mutations for T cell-associated lymphoma: TET2, IDH2, and RHOA mutations are commonly observed in peripheral T cell lymphomas (PTCL), while STAT3 and STAT5B mutations are unique to large granular lymphocytic (LGL) leukemia. Furthermore, transcriptomics analysis and visualization techniques have revealed key cellular receptors and pathways to specify diagnostics further. NOTCH signaling pathway, T-cell Receptor (TCR) signaling pathways, and T-cell associated genes (Tet2, Dmnt3) were found to be prominent in T cell, and B cell-related lymphomas and helped to diagnose subtypes of PTCL. On the other hand, subtypes of DLBCL and display mutations associated with B cells change B cell receptor (BcR), NOTCH signaling pathway, Toll-like receptor (TLR), and NF-κB signaling cascade. Simply put, the increasing knowledge of genetic aberration in lymphoma provides more information to design precision diagnostic tests for major and subtype lymphomas.

=== Molecular analysis in cancer diagnostics ===
Tumor sampling and molecular analysis are common ways to determine the properties of cancers as well as cancer progression and host immune response. Cancers of unknown origin claim a small portion of all cancers globally. Previously unknown primary tumors were discovered from PD-1 mutations and amplifications thanks to high-dimension molecular profiling. A suspected carcinoma or poorly differentiated one may also be justified to apply to medical care. Newer technologies such as endobronchial ultrasound-guided transbronchial needle aspiration biopsy (EBUS-TBNA) are currently used in lung cancer diagnostics with 95% sensitivity and over 95% specificity. This minimally invasive method collects samples for morphological diagnosis and IHC/ISH characterization to determine the cancer subtype and corresponding drug for treatment. Whole smear slides (WSI) also show potential for newer molecular analysis. Able to create a digital library of whole slide images from cytology data, clinicians can have more information at diagnosis in Rapid on-site evaluation.

Conventionally, the treatment of cancers has been reliant on the morphological diagnosis of the cell type and tissue, taking microphytic and simple biological techniques to identify cancer subtypes. However, this method is proven to be hard for metastatic tumors with primary tumors further away from the site of discovery. Upon using recent high dimensional complete molecular sequencing, diagnostics results may also include mutations observed in tumors to better understand cancer types and aid future treatment plans. An extreme example of a group of cancer, Esophageal adenocarcinomas, which are hardly distinguishable by morphology, makes morphological diagnosis extremely difficult. This is because nearly all oesophageal adenocarcinomas arise from Barrett's mucosa. Using cDNA microarrays, the genetic variations of subtypes of oesophageal adenocarcinomas are profiled and the prognosis of invasive hot cancers of this category is greatly improved.

== Evaluation of precision medicine ==
=== Advantages ===
As mentioned above, precision medicine brings unique insights into personalized treatments based on genetic information. Compared to conventional healthcare technology, precision medicine has several short and long-term advantages. Namely, healthcare professionals can use genetic data collected from patients to determine a personalized treatment. Since every person has a different set of genome information, they may have different responses to the same treatment, making personalized treatment a crucial step forward in the medical field.

With the help of precision medicine, scientists can gain better insights into the underlying causes of diseases in the population with certain genome information. Subpopulations with similar genome information, such as close family members, have a relatively high chance of developing certain genetic conditions or diseases. By identifying the underlying causes, healthcare professionals can take the essential steps to prevent the patients from developing the conditions. For instance, the underlying causes of disease may include environmental and lifestyle reasons. When identified early, medical professionals can perform an early intervention that can significantly improve and prevent the disease. In research about the onset of pneumonia, early intervention has reduced the mortality rate from 90% to 41%, reinforcing the importance of early diagnosis.

Moreover, information gained from precision medicine may lead to reduced costs spent on healthcare services. Since genetic information often reveals the possible causes and trigger factors of the development of certain diseases, it can reduce the unnecessary costs spent on identifying conditions. According to research, eliminating unwarranted variations in medical care can reduce the cost of patient management by at least 35 percent. The healthcare professional can figure out the best possible treatment with detailed patients' genetic information. The comprehensive information about the patients can be used to avoid unnecessary diagnostic testing and scanning, which reduces the cost of healthcare.

=== Limitations ===
Despite the benefits of precision medicine, it has several limitations and pitfalls for patients. Firstly, precision medicine promotes individual benefits by providing necessary insights into the best treatment for a specific genome mutation population. However, the cost of collecting genome information will increase. There may be an increase in price for private medical consultations, limiting the number of people who can benefit from precision medicine. With the increased cost, fewer people can afford the medical service; it may only provide value to patients with sufficient financial capability. As stated, the improved quality of healthcare does not mean it is more cost-effective; it may further drive economic inequality in the health system. This will limit precision medicine to an individual's benefit instead of improving the healthcare system as a collective benefit.

Since precision medicine proposes the customization and personalization of treatments, it is tailored to a particular subgroup of patients. Suppose the data collected reflected that a small subset of the patient population is unresponsive to specific drugs; large pharmaceutical companies might not be willing to develop alternative drugs for them due to financial reasons. It is only a small group, so it does not seem as big as an earning opportunity for pharmaceutical companies. Hence, data collected in precision medicine may introduce unfair treatment between different subgroups of patients.

Precision medicine requires the storing of patients' sensitive health information in a database. Genetic information obtained through sequencing platforms is unique to the patient and is considered protected health information under the Health Insurance Portability and Accountability Act. While this regulates how genetic information is stored to protect patient privacy, it does not necessarily prevent attackers from hacking the database. It might introduce genetic discrimination where people are being treated differently because of their genome information.

== Prospects ==
With the help of advanced technology and data collected in precision medicine, it improves clinical decision-making. Since every medical decision is based on factors related to the patients, such as genetic information, sociodemographic characteristics, etc., the large dataset in precision medicine allows medical professionals to approach the treatment with a handful of data, which allows for more accurate and effective treatment.

Another potential prospect would be health apps which can be used for digital diagnostic devices in the form of a wearable biosensor. By utilizing AI technology, patients can obtain essential information such as any physiological data. The data obtained from these health apps can be used by medical professionals to evaluate the information and determine the best possible treatment.

Besides obtaining genome information, there is an 'Omics'-based biomarkers that could be one of the prospects in future precision medicine. The omics-based test is considered a form of biomarker that helps capture information to understand patients' lives. The recent development in Omic-based biomarkers has improved the complexity of information obtained from patients and also reduced the cost of the process. This can be beneficial in future precision medicine as it makes obtaining patients' health conditions more cost-effective and enables the gathering of more data.
