= Tibotec =

Defunct pharmaceutical company (1994–2002)

- Industry: Pharmaceutical
- Founded: 1994; 32 years ago
- Founders: Rudi Pauwels; Carine Claeys; Marie-Pierre de Béthune; Kurt Hertogs; Hilde Azijn
- Defunct: 2002
- Fate: Acquired by Johnson & Johnson and merged into its Janssen Pharmaceuticals division
- Website: tibotec.com

Tibotec was a pharmaceutical company with a focus on research and development of the treatment of infectious diseases such as HIV/AIDS and hepatitis C. The company was founded in 1994 and then acquired by Johnson & Johnson and merged into its Janssen Pharmaceuticals division in 2002. The company is part of Johnson & Johnson Innovation Medicine business segment.

The name of the company is derived from the tetrahydro-imidazo[4,5,1-jk][1,4]-benzodiazepine-2(1H)-one and -thione (TIBO) compounds discovered at the Rega Institute for Medical Research (Belgium).

== History ==
In 1994, Rudi Pauwels of the Rega Institute for Medical Research founded Tibotec, together with his wife Carine Claeys, and their first co-workers Marie-Pierre de Béthune, Kurt Hertogs, and Hilde Azijn. In 1995 Paul Stoffels joined Tibotec. The company was acquired by Johnson & Johnson in April 2002, and was renamed Janssen Therapeutics in June 2011.

Tibotec provided funding for HIV treatment clinical trials at the Infectious Diseases Institute in Kampala, Uganda.

== Drugs ==
- Darunavir (TMC114, tradename Prezista), a protease inhibitor
- Etravirine (TMC125, tradename Intelence), a non-nucleoside reverse transcriptase inhibitor (NNRTI)
- Bedaquiline (TMC207/R207910, tradename Sirturo), an diarylquinoline anti-tuberculosis drug
- Rilpivirine (TMC278, tradename Edurant), an NNRTI
- Simeprevir (TMC435, tradename Olysio), an HCV NS3/4A protease inhibitor for treatment of chronic hepatitis C in combination with pegylated interferon/ribavirin or with other direct-acting anti-HCV agents.
- Dapivirine (TMC120), an NNRTI licensed to the International Partnership for Microbicides for its development as a vaginal microbicide in March 2004.

== See also ==
- Galapagos NV
