= Diarylpyrimidines =

Class of chemical compounds

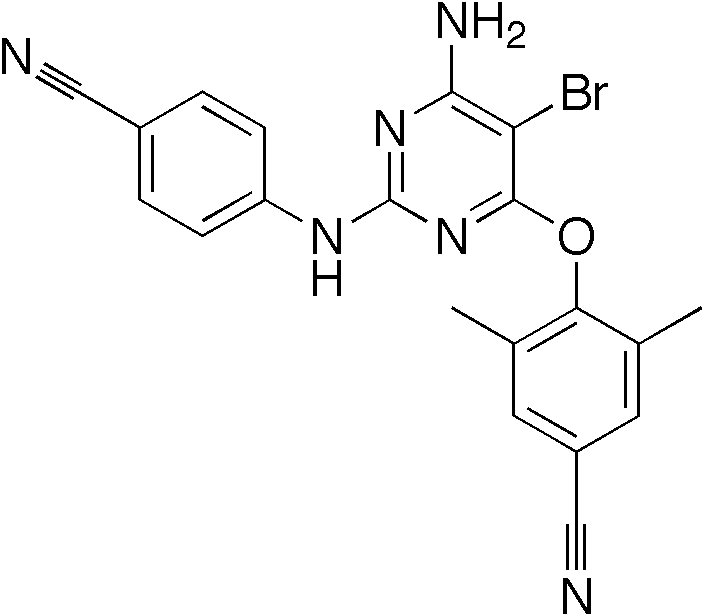
Chemical structure of etravirine (Intelence)

Diarylpyrimidines (DAPY) and diaryltriazines (DATA) are two closely related classes of molecules resembling the pyrimidine nucleotides found in DNA. They show great potency in inhibiting the activity of HIV reverse transcriptase. Several compounds in this class are non-nucleoside reverse transcriptase inhibitors used clinically in the treatment of HIV/AIDS, notably etravirine and rilpivirine.
