= Cilag =

Swiss pharma company

Cilag AG is a Swiss pharmaceutical company. Cilag is a subsidiary of American pharmaceutical giant Johnson & Johnson. The company is part of Johnson & Johnson Innovative Medicine business segment.

== Company history ==
In 1933, Swiss chemist Bernhard Joos set up a small research laboratory in Schaffhausen, Switzerland. This set the basis for the founding of Chemische Industrie-Labor AG (Chemical Industry Laboratory AG or Cilag) on 12 May 1936.

The first president of Cilag's administrative board was Carl Naegeli, a well-known professor at the Chemical Institute of the University of Zurich. After the death of Naegeli in 1942, Joos himself then took over the managing role until he left the company in 1949.

In 1959, Cilag joined the Johnson & Johnson family of companies.

In the early 1990s, the marketing organizations of Cilag and Janssen Pharmaceuticals were joined to form Janssen-Cilag. The non-marketing activities of both companies still operate under their original name.

Cilag continues to have operations under the Cilag name in Switzerland, ranging from research and development through manufacturing and international services.

In August 2014 Cilag acquired Covagen a biopharmaceutical company which specialises in the development of multi-specific protein based therapeutics. As part of the acquisition Cilag will gain access to Covagen’s lead drug candidate, COVA 322, a bi-specific anti-tumor necrosis factor (TNF)-alpha/anti-interleukin (IL)-17A FynomAb, is in a Phase Ib study for psoriasis.

== Product history ==
Joos' first discovery was pyridazil, an azo dyestuff derived from pyridine, which is an analgesic for the urinary tract. By 1952 Joos had discovered seven new chemical compounds and developed them into new products.

The company's research and development record covers discoveries and developments in the fields of biotechnology, central nervous system, women's health, dermatology, anti-infectives and immunology.

== See also ==
- List of pharmaceutical companies
- Pharmaceutical industry in Switzerland
