= Johan Cardoen =

Belgian scientist and businessman (1958-2025)

- Born: May 18, 1958
- Died: December 17, 2025 (aged 67)
- Education: Katholieke Universiteit Leuven (PhD)
- Occupations: Scientist and Businessman

Johan Cardoen (May 18, 1958 – December 17, 2025) was a Belgian scientist and businessman. He was managing director of VIB and board member of FlandersBio. He obtained a PhD in biology at the Katholieke Universiteit Leuven (Leuven) in 1987.

Cardoen worked for CropDesign between 1999 and 2012. He spent most of his career in agricultural biotechnology companies such as Plant Genetic Systems, Hoechst Schering AgrEvo GmbH and Aventis CropScience.

== Sources ==
- Johan Cardoen (PDF)
- CropDesign sluit miljoenen-contract met BASF Plant Science (in Dutch)
- In memoriam
