= Constant Janssen =

Belgian businessman and physician

Jan Constant Janssen (18 September 1895 – 15 April 1970) was a Belgian physician and businessman. He was the third child (out of four) of Adriaan Victor Janssen (1854–1942) and Anna Catharina Eelen (1855–1929). He went to high school in Hoogstraten and studied medicine at the Catholic University of Leuven and the University of Ghent. On 16 April 1925, he married Margriet Fleerackers (5 January 1897 – 23 September 1973), together they had four children.

== Career ==
He started his career as a family physician in Turnhout, but in addition he was interested in business too. In 1921, he met Ladislas Richter in Vienna, who was the son of Gedeon Richter, who owned a pharmaceutical factory in Budapest, Hungary. In 1933, he acquired the right to distribute the pharmaceutical products of Richter, the Hungarian pharmaceutical company, for Belgium, the Netherlands and Belgian Congo. On 23 October 1934, he founded the N.V. Produkten Richter in Turnhout. In 1937 Constant Janssen acquired an old factory building in the Statiestraat 78 in Turnhout for his growing company, which he expanded during World War II into a four-storey building. In 1938 he closed his practice as a family physician and concentrated his effort of the expansion of his pharmaceutical business. His wife managed the production, quality control, and the administration of the company.

Still a medical student, his son Paul Janssen helped with the development of Perdolan. After World War II, the brandname of the products was changed into Eupharma, and later the company would evolve into Janssen Pharmaceutica.

== Sources ==
- Dirk Collier (Ed.), Dr. Constant Janssen, Janssen Pharmaceutica, 1996
