= Beerse =

- Municipality
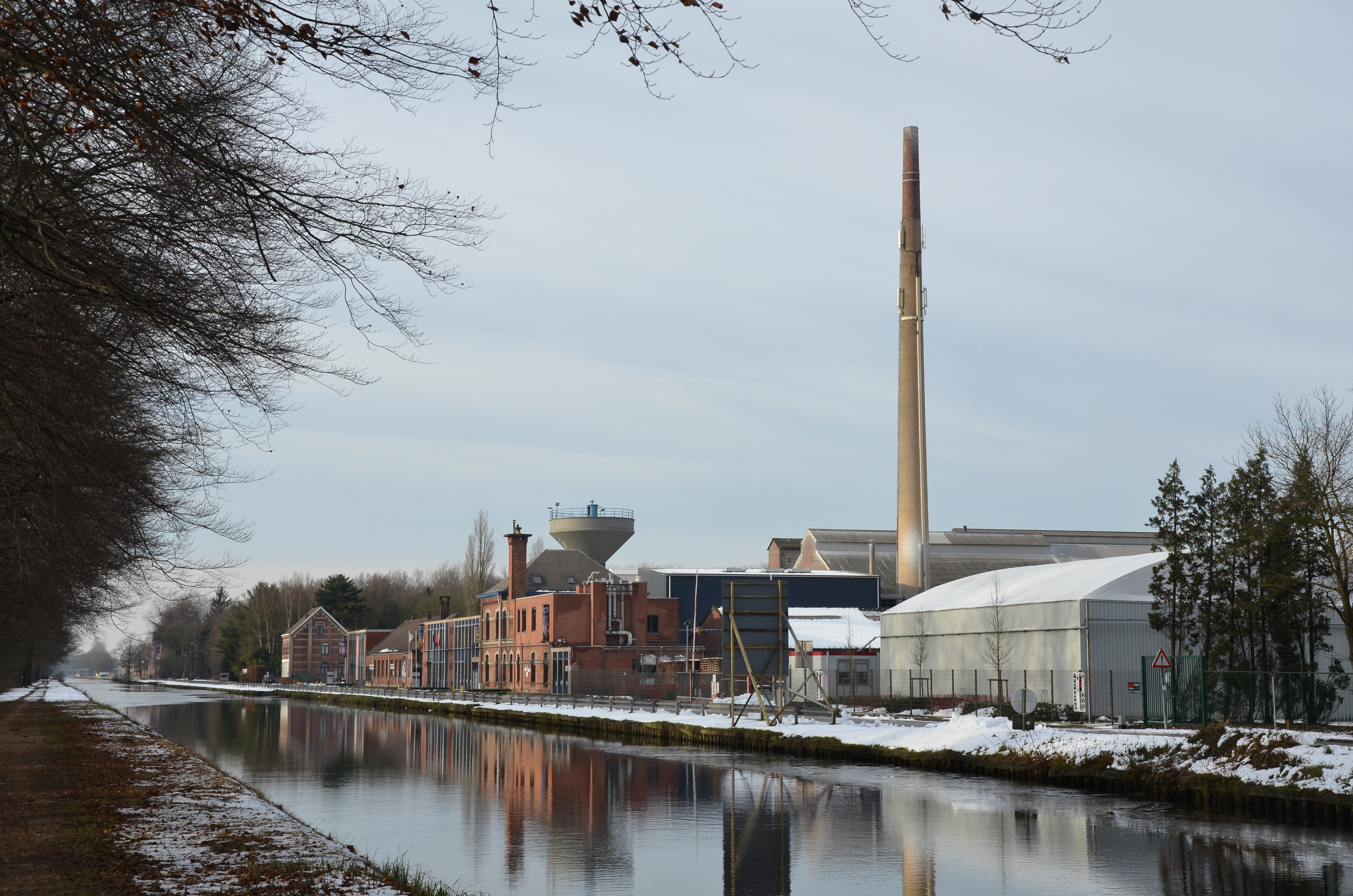

- Flag Coat of arms

- Location of Beerse in the province of Antwerp
- Interactive map of Beerse
- Location in Belgium
- Coordinates: 51°19′N 04°52′E
- Country: Belgium
- Community: Flemish Community
- Region: Flemish Region
- Province: Antwerp
- Arrondissement: Turnhout

Government
  - Mayor: Bart Craane (CDE-Vlim)
  - Governing parties: CDE-Vlim, BEERSEplus

Area
  - Total: 37.36 km^{2} (14.42 sq mi)

Population (2020-01-01)
  - Total: 18,128
  - Density: 485.2/km^{2} (1,257/sq mi)
- Postal codes: 2340
- NIS code: 13004
- Area codes: 014, 03
- Website: www.beerse.be

Beerse (Dutch pronunciation: [ˈbeːrsə]) is a municipality located in the Belgian province of Antwerp. The municipality comprises the towns of Beerse proper and Vlimmeren. In 2024, Beerse had a total population of 18,601. The total area is 37.48 km^{2} (14.47 sq mi). The pharmaceutical company Janssen Pharmaceutica, founded by Dr. Paul Janssen, has its headquarters in Beerse.

== Industry ==
Several companies are located in Beerse, of which the most important are:

- Janssen Pharmaceutica (pharmaceuticals)
- Metallo-Chimique (metallurgy)
- Wienerberger Beerse (bricks)
- Glacio (ice cream)
- Aurora productions (paper and plastics)

== Climate ==
Climate data for Beerse (1991−2020 normals)
Month	Jan	Feb	Mar	Apr	May	Jun	Jul	Aug	Sep	Oct	Nov	Dec	Year
Mean daily maximum °C (°F)	6.3 (43.3)	7.4 (45.3)	11.1 (52.0)	15.5 (59.9)	19.1 (66.4)	21.7 (71.1)	23.7 (74.7)	23.5 (74.3)	20.0 (68.0)	15.2 (59.4)	10.1 (50.2)	6.7 (44.1)	15.0 (59.0)
Daily mean °C (°F)	3.6 (38.5)	4.0 (39.2)	6.8 (44.2)	10.1 (50.2)	13.9 (57.0)	16.8 (62.2)	18.7 (65.7)	18.3 (64.9)	15.1 (59.2)	11.2 (52.2)	7.0 (44.6)	4.1 (39.4)	10.8 (51.4)
Mean daily minimum °C (°F)	0.8 (33.4)	0.6 (33.1)	2.5 (36.5)	4.8 (40.6)	8.7 (47.7)	11.8 (53.2)	13.8 (56.8)	13.2 (55.8)	10.3 (50.5)	7.2 (45.0)	4.0 (39.2)	1.5 (34.7)	6.6 (43.9)
Average precipitation mm (inches)	77.6 (3.06)	71.6 (2.82)	62.2 (2.45)	46.2 (1.82)	62.6 (2.46)	77.5 (3.05)	84.2 (3.31)	86.1 (3.39)	74.3 (2.93)	74.6 (2.94)	86.3 (3.40)	100.1 (3.94)	903.3 (35.56)
Average precipitation days (≥ 1.0 mm)	13.1	12.3	11.2	9.1	10.1	10.5	11.0	11.2	10.2	11.4	13.5	15.0	138.5
Mean monthly sunshine hours	61	78	133	187	215	214	220	206	160	116	67	51	1,707
Source: Royal Meteorological Institute

== Notable inhabitants ==
- Peter Evrard, singer
- René Verheyen, soccer player
- Patrick Vervoort, soccer player
