= Paul Janssen =

Belgian physician (1926–2003)

- Born: 12 September 1926; Turnhout, Belgium
- Died: 11 November 2003 (aged 77); Rome, Italy
- Education: Université de Namur; Catholic University of Louvain; Ghent University; University of Cologne
- Occupations: Physician; Founder, Janssen Pharmaceutica
- Spouse: Dora Arts
- Parent(s): Constant Janssen; Margriet Fleerackers

Paul Adriaan Jan, Baron Janssen (12 September 1926 – 11 November 2003) was a Belgian physician. He was the founder of Janssen Pharmaceutica, a pharmaceutical company with over 20,000 employees which became a subsidiary of Johnson & Johnson.

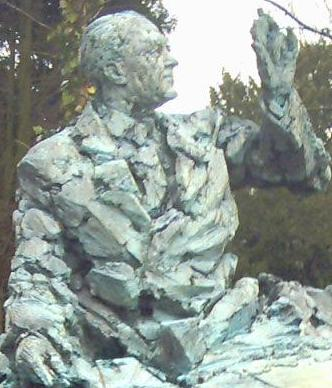
Statue of Janssen in Beerse, Belgium

== Early life and education ==
Janssen was born on 12 September 1926, in Turnhout, to Constant Janssen and Margriet Fleerackers.

He attended secondary school at the Jesuit St Jozef college in Turnhout, Belgium after which he decided to follow in his father's footsteps and become a physician. During World War II Janssen studied physics, biology and chemistry at the Facultés universitaires Notre-Dame de la Paix (FUNDP) in Namur. He then studied medicine at the Catholic University of Leuven and Ghent University. In 1951, Janssen received his medical degree magna cum laude from Ghent University. He graduated with a postdoctoral degree in pharmacology at the same university in 1956, and studied at the Institute of Pharmacology of the University of Cologne.

On 16 April 1957, he married Dora Arts.

== Career ==
During his military service and until 1952, he worked at the Institute of Pharmacology of the University of Cologne. After he returned to Belgium, he worked part time at the Ghent University Institute of Pharmacology and Therapeutics, headed by Corneille Heymans, who had won the Nobel Prize for medicine in 1938.

With a loan of fifty thousand Belgian francs received from his father, Janssen founded his own research laboratory in 1953. That same year, he discovered ambucetamide, an antispasmodic found to be particularly effective for the relief of menstrual pain.

In 1956, Janssen received his habilitation in pharmacology with pro venia legendi ("permission to lecture") designation for his thesis on Compounds of the R 79 type. He left the university and established what would become Janssen Pharmaceutica.

On 11 February 1958, he developed haloperidol, a major breakthrough in the treatment of schizophrenia. Working with his team, he developed the fentanyl family of drugs and a number of anesthetic agents, including droperidol and etomidate. One of the anti-diarrheal drugs he developed, diphenoxylate (Lomotil), was used in the Apollo program.

In 1959, Janssen synthesized the potent opioid fentanyl based on SAR studies of meperidine. In the 1970s, he would improve upon the potency of fentanyl with the synthesis of Carfentanil.

In 1985, Janssen Pharmaceutical became the first Western pharmaceutical company to establish a factory in China. In 1995, together with Paul Lewi, he founded the Center for Molecular Design, where he and his team used a supercomputer to search candidate molecules for potential AIDS treatments.

Altogether Janssen and his cadre of scientists discovered more than eighty new medications, four of which are on the WHO list of essential medicines.

In 1991, he was elevated to the Belgian nobility by King Baudouin receiving the title of Baron.

== Death ==
Janssen died in Rome, on 11 November 2003, aged 77, while attending the celebration of the 400th anniversary of the founding of the Pontifical Academy of Sciences, of which he had been a member since 1990.

== Popularity polls ==
- In 2005, he finished as runner up, after Father Damien, in the poll for The Greatest Belgian organized by the regional Flemish television.
- On Wednesday 22 October 2008, Paul Janssen was awarded the title of Most Important Belgian Scientist, an initiative of the Eos magazine.

== See also ==
- Gedeon Richter Ltd.
- Gairdner Foundation International Award
- Tibotec
- Rega Institute for Medical Research
