= Janssen Pharmaceuticals =

Belgian pharmaceutical company

Johnson & Johnson Innovative Medicine
- Type: Subsidiary
- Industry: Pharmaceutical
- Founded: 1953; 73 years ago
- Founder: Paul Janssen
- Headquarters: Turnhoutseweg 30, Beerse, Belgium
- Area served: Worldwide
- Key people: Jennifer Taubert
- Number of employees: 45.000
- Parent: Johnson & Johnson
- Website: janssen.com

Johnson & Johnson Innovative Medicine (formerly Janssen Pharmaceuticals) is a Belgian pharmaceutical company headquartered in Beerse, Belgium, and wholly owned by Johnson & Johnson. It was founded in 1953 by Paul Janssen.

In 1961, Janssen Pharmaceuticals was purchased by the New Jersey–based American corporation Johnson & Johnson. It became part of Johnson & Johnson Pharmaceutical Research and Development (J&J PRD), which was later renamed Janssen Research and Development, LLC (JRD). This division conducts research and development activities related to a wide range of human medical disorders, including mental illness, neurological disorders, anesthesia and analgesia, gastrointestinal disorders, fungal infections, HIV/AIDS, allergies, and cancer. Janssen and Ortho-McNeil Pharmaceutical were later placed into the Ortho-McNeil-Janssen group within Johnson & Johnson.

== Subsidiaries ==
- Actelion
- Cilag AG
- Janssen Biotech (formerly Centocor)
- Janssen Vaccines (formerly Crucell)
- Tibotec

== History ==
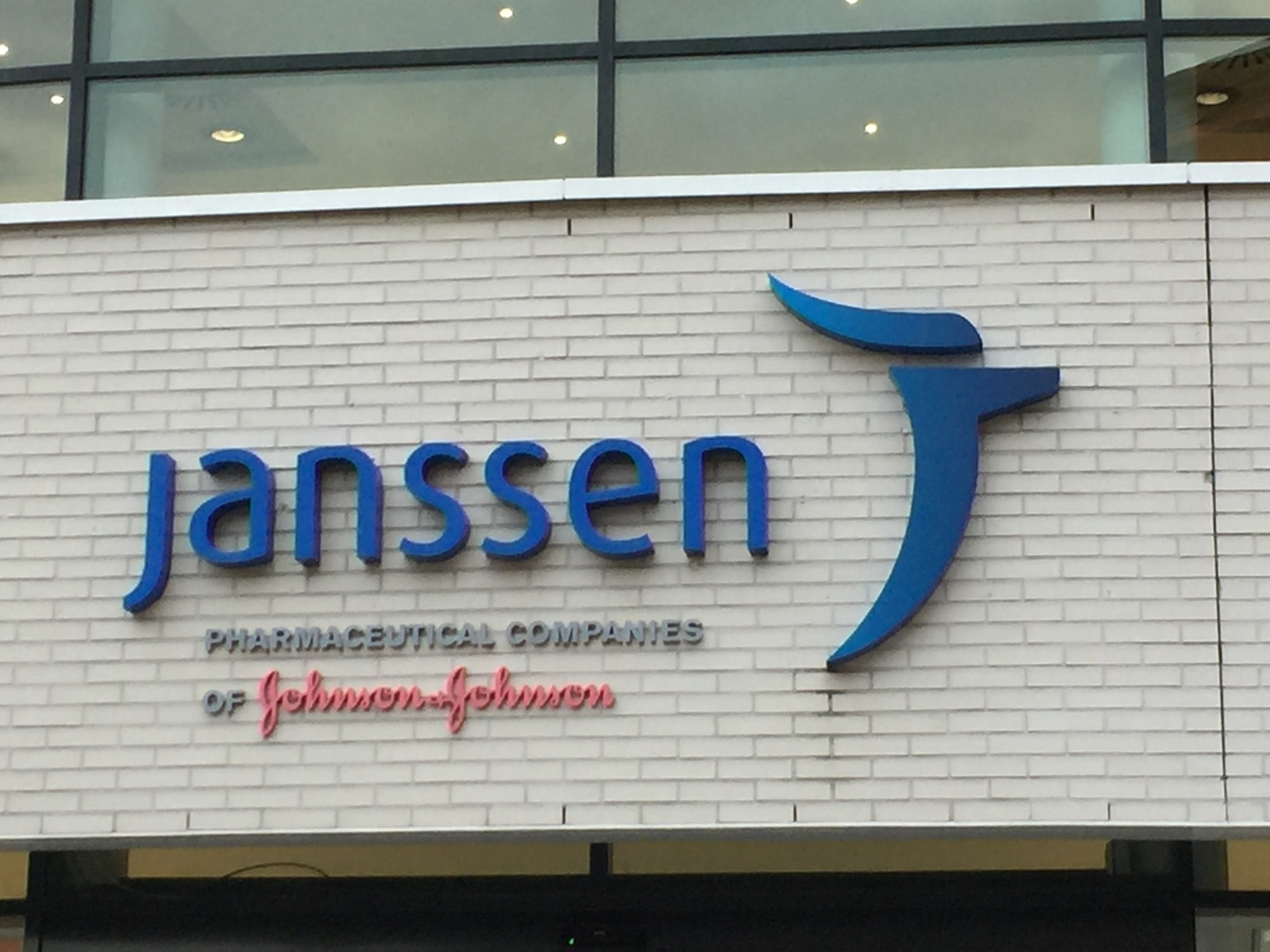
Janssen (Leiden, 2021)

The roots of what would become Janssen Pharmaceuticals date back to 1933. That year, Constant Janssen, the father of Paul Janssen, acquired the rights to distribute the pharmaceutical products of Richter, a Hungarian pharmaceutical company, across Belgium, the Netherlands, and the Belgian Congo. On 23 October 1934, he founded N.V. Produkten Richter in Turnhout. In 1937, Constant Janssen acquired an old factory building at Statiestraat 78 in Turnhout for his growing company, which he expanded into a four-story building during World War II. While still a student, Paul Janssen assisted in developing paracetamol (USP: acetaminophen, often referred to generically under the trademark Tylenol) under the name Perdolan, which later became well-known. After the war, the name for the company's products was changed to Eupharma, although the company name Richter remained until 1956.

Paul Janssen founded his own research laboratory in 1953 on the third floor of the Statiestraat building, still within his father's Richter-Eupharma company. In 1955, he and his team developed their first drug, Neomeritine (ambucetamide), an antispasmodic found to be particularly effective for relieving menstrual pain. On 5 April 1956, the name of the company was changed to NV Laboratoria Pharmaceutica C. Janssen (named after Constant Janssen). On 27 April 1957, the company opened a new research facility in Beerse, but the relocation would not be completed until the 1971 to 1972 period. On 2 May 1958, the research department in Beerse became a separate legal entity, N.V. Research Laboratorium C. Janssen.

On 25 October 1961, the company was acquired by the American corporation Johnson & Johnson. This acquisition helped the company increase its resources and reach a larger market. The negotiations were led by Frans Van den Bergh, head of the board of directors. On 10 February 1964, the name was changed to Janssen Pharmaceutica N.V., and the company's seat was transferred from Turnhout to Beerse. The company was led by Paul Janssen, Bob Stouthuysen, and Frans Van Den Bergh. When pharmaceutical production also moved to Beerse between 1971 and 1972, the move from Turnhout was completed. Between 1990 and 2004, Janssen expanded worldwide, growing to about 28,000 employees globally.

From the beginning, Janssen emphasized research into new drug development as its core activity. The research department established in Beerse in 1957 developed into a large research campus. In 1987, the Janssen Research Foundation (JRF) was founded to perform research into new drugs in Beerse and other laboratories around the globe. Janssen became the Flemish company with the largest budget for research and development. Besides its headquarters, research departments, pharmaceutical production, and administrative divisions in Beerse, Janssen Pharmaceutica still maintains Belgian offices in Berchem (Janssen-Cilag), a chemical factory in Geel, and Janssen Biotech in Olen.

The chemical production plant in Geel makes active ingredients for the company's medicines. In 1975, the first plant of a new chemical factory Plant I was established in Geel, Plant II was opened in 1977, Plant III' in 1984, and Plant IV in 1995. In 1999 the remaining chemical production in Beerse was transferred to Geel. About 80% of its active components are manufactured there. The site in Geel also manufactures about two-thirds of the worldwide chemical production of the pharmaceutical sector of Johnson & Johnson. In 1995, the Center for Molecular Design (CMD) was founded by Paul Janssen and Paul Lewi.

In 1999, clinical research and non-clinical development become a global organization within Johnson & Johnson. In 2001, part of the research activities was transferred to the United States with the reorganization of research activities in the Johnson & Johnson Pharmaceutical Research Development (JJPRD) organization. The research activities of the Janssen Research Foundation (JRF) and the R.W. Johnson Pharmaceutical Research Institute (PRI) (United States) were merged into the new global research organization. A new building for pharmaceutical development was completed in Beerse in 2001. In 2002, a new logistics and informatics centre was opened at a new site, Beerse 2. In 2003 two new research buildings were constructed, the Discovery Research Center (DRC), and the Drug Safety Evaluation Center (DSEC). On 27 October 2004, the Paul Janssen Research Center, for discovery research, was inaugurated.

In 2011, Johnson & Johnson subsidiary Centocor became Janssen Biotech, part of Janssen Pharmaceuticals.

Also in 2011, Johnson & Johnson acquired Crucell, and assigned it to Janssen. The acquisition of Crucell provided Janssen with a disease prevention arm. By 2014, Crucell was renamed Janssen Vaccines.

In March 2015, Janssen licensed tipifarnib (a farnesyl transferase inhibitor) to Kura Oncology who will assume sole responsibility for developing and commercialising the anti-cancer drug. Later in the same month the company announced that Galapagos Pharma had regained the rights to the anti-inflammatory drug candidate GLPG1690 as well as two other compounds including GLPG1205 (a first-in-class inhibitor of GPR84).

In May 2016, the company launched a collaboration MacroGenics and the preclinical cancer treatment, MGD015. The deal could net MacroGenics more than $740 million.

In September 2017 Janssen teamed up with the Biomedical Advanced Research and Development Authority (BARDA), a unit of the U.S. Department of Health and Human Services, to create pandemic flu vaccines. BARDA gave Janssen $43 million in the first year and $273 million over five years for the contract. One of the projects in the contract is the development of a universal flu vaccine. The intent of the vaccine would be to protect people against all or most flu strains.

On 5 March 2019, the Food and Drug Administration approved Janssen's Spravato (esketamine nasal spray) for treatment-resistant major depressive disorder. This marked the first approval of a new type of antidepressant in decades.

In 2021, Janssen became a defendant in a trial against several opioid manufacturers filed by New York Attorney General Letitia James. The company was removed from the case after Johnson & Johnson agreed to a pay a $230 million settlement to New York State.

=== Janssen Biotech ===
The subsidiary Janssen Biotech, Inc. was founded in Philadelphia in 1979 as Centocor Biotech, Inc., with an initial goal to develop new diagnostic assays using monoclonal antibody technology.

==== Centocor Biotech ====
In 1982, Centocor became a publicly traded company. In the early 1980s, the company moved to Malvern, Pennsylvania. In 1984, Centocor opened an overseas plant in Leiden, the Netherlands.

In 1997, eighteen years after its foundation, Centocor achieved its first year of operating profitability. In 1998, Centocor sold its diagnostic division to Fujirebio, Inc.

In 1999, Centocor became a wholly owned subsidiary of Johnson & Johnson.

In 2004, Centocor purchased a new manufacturing plant in St. Louis, Missouri, and is opening a new manufacturing facility in County Cork, Ireland. The Dutch plant has been expanded substantially with a $250 million investment in additional production facilities, which were opened in 2006.

In 2007, Centocor broke new ground in advertising by releasing Innerstate, believed to be the first theatrically released documentary film both created and entirely funded by a drug company, to promote Remicade (Infliximab).

==== Centocor Ortho Biotech ====
In 2008, Centocor, Inc. and Ortho Biotech Inc. merged to form Centocor Ortho Biotech Inc.

In June 2010, Centocor Ortho Biotech acquired RespiVert, a privately held drug discovery company focused on developing small-molecule, inhaled therapies for the treatment of pulmonary diseases.

==== As Janssen Biotech ====
In June 2011, Centocor Ortho Biotech changed its name to Janssen Biotech, Inc. as part of a global effort to unite the Janssen Pharmaceutical Companies around the world under a common identity.

In December 2014, the company announced it would co-develop MacroGenics cancer drug candidate (MGD011) which targets both CD19 and CD3 proteins in treating B-cell malignant tumours. This could net MacroGenics up to $700 million.

In January 2015, the company announced it would use Ionis Pharmaceuticals' (formerly Isis Pharmaceuticals) RNA-targeting technology to discover and develop antisense drugs targeting autoimmune disorders of the gastrointestinal tract.

In December 2019, XBiotech Inc. announced it would sell its novel antibody treatment (bermekimab) that neutralizes interleukin-1 alpha (IL-1⍺) to Janssen Biotech, Inc.

=== COVID-19 vaccine development ===
On 27 March 2020, the U.S. Biomedical Advanced Research and Development Authority (BARDA) allocated $456 million for J&J (Janssen) to develop a vaccine against the novel coronavirus.

=== In China ===
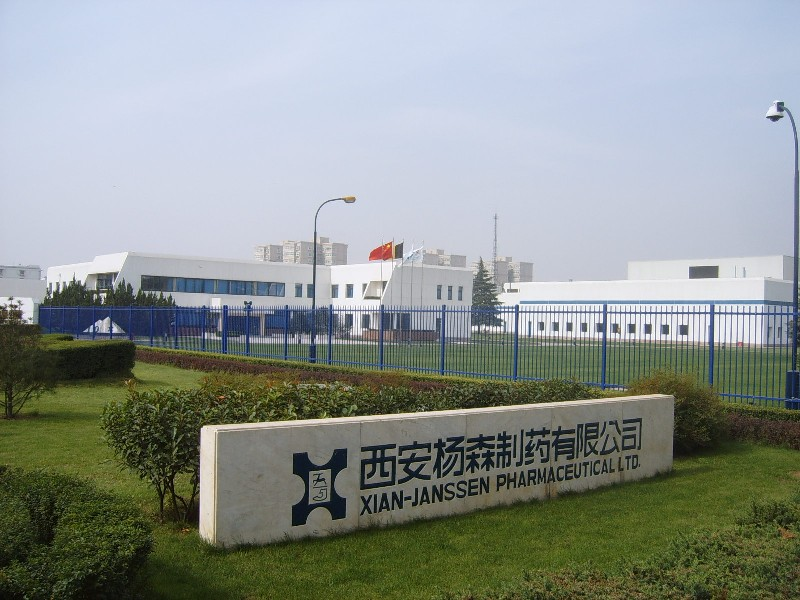
Xi'an-Janssen

Janssen Pharmaceuticals was the first Western pharmaceutical company to set up a pharmaceutical factory in the People's Republic of China.

In 1976, Paul Janssen met Ma Haide (born George Shafik Hatem), a Lebanese-American doctor who had started working in China in 1933. After three days of meetings, the two agreed to bring a modernized pharmaceutical business to China. When Deng Xiaoping opened China to the West in 1978, Janssen sent Paul Appermont and Joos Horsten to set up the project.

In 1983, Janssen signed a cooperative contract to modernize production in an old chemical factory in the city of Hanzhong, in Shaanxi. This factory would soon produce the active compound of Janssen products such as mebendazole. In 1985, operating as Xian-Janssen Pharmaceuticals, a large factory was opened in the city of Xi'an, also in Shaanxi province.

== Drugs developed ==
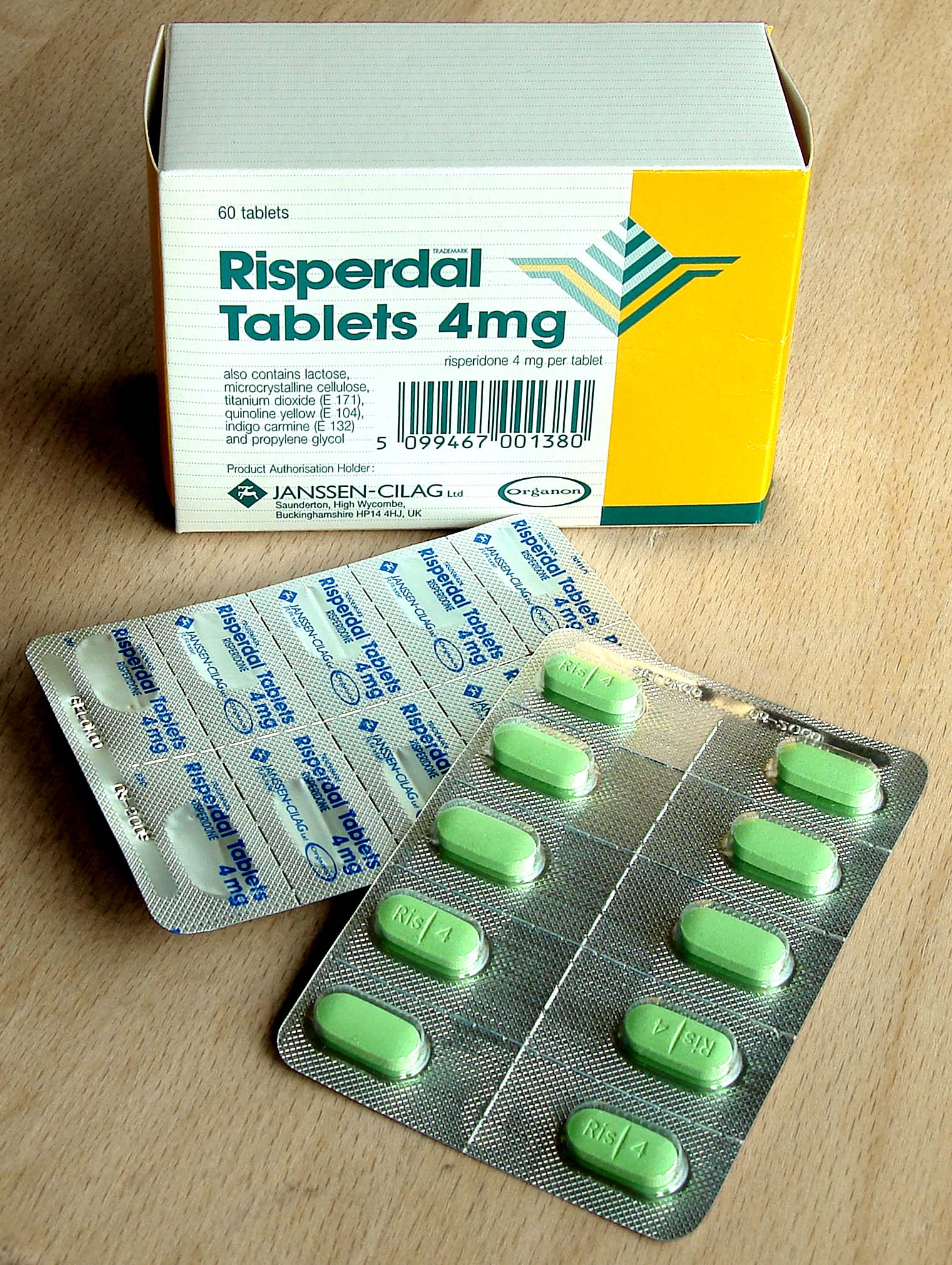
Risperdal tablets

| R-code | Name | Brand name | Synthesized | Marketed |
|---|---|---|---|---|
| R5 | ambucetamide | Neomeritine | 1953 | 1955 |
| R79 | isopropamide iodide | Priamide-Janssen | 1954 | 1955 |
| R244 | isopropamide bromide | Vesalium | 1954 | 1955 |
| R253 | diisopromine | Bilagol | 1955 | 1956 |
| R725 | prozapine | Sedalium | 1956 | 1962 |
| R874 | dextromoramide | Palfium | 1955 | 1957 |
| R1132 | diphenoxylate | Reasec | 1956 | 1960 |
| R1561 | phenoperidine | Operidine, Lealgin | 1957 | 1959 |
| R1575 | cinnarizine | Stugeron | 1955 | 1958 |
| R1625 | haloperidol | Haldol | 1958 | 1959 |
| R1929 | azaperone | Stresnil | 1958 | 1968 |
| R2498 | trifluperidol | Triperidol | 1959 | 1961 |
| R3345 | pipamperone | Dipiperon | 1960 | 1961 |
| R3365 | piritramide | Dipidolor | 1960 | 1967 |
| R4263 | fentanyl | Sublimaze | 1960 | 1963 |
| R4584 | benperidol | Frenactyl | 1961 | 1965 |
| R4749 | droperidol | Dehydrobenzperidol | 1961 | 1963 |
| R4845 | bezitramide | Burgodin | 1961 | 1971 |
| R6218 | fluspirilene | Imap | 1963 | 1971 |
| R6238 | pimozide | Orap | 1963 | 1970 |
| R7904 | lidoflazine | Clinium | 1964 | 1969 |
| R11333 | bromperidol | Impromen | 1966 | 1981 |
| R12564 | levamisole | Ergamisol | 1966 | 1969 |
| R13672 | haloperidol decanoate | Haldol decanoas | 1967 | 1981 |
| R14889 | miconazole nitrate | Daktarin | 1967 | 1971 |
| R14950 | flunarizine | Sibelium | 1967 | 1977 |
| R15889 | lorcainide | Remivox | 1968 | 1983 |
| R16341 | penfluridol | Semap | 1968 | 1973 |
| R16470 | dexetimide | Tremblex | 1968 | 1972 |
| R16659 | etomidate | Hypnomidate | 1964 | 1977 |
| R17635 | mebendazole | Vermox | 1968 | 1972 |
| R18553 | loperamide | Imodium | 1969 | 1973 |
| R33800 | sufentanil | Sufenta | 1974 | 1979 |
| R33812 | domperidone | Motilium | 1974 | 1978 |
| R35443 | oxatomide | Tinset | 1975 | 1981 |
| R39209 | alfentanil | Rapifen | 1976 | 1983 |
| R33799 | carfentanil | Wildnil | 1976 | 1980? |
| R41400 | ketoconazole | Nizoral | 1976 | 1981 |
| R43512 | astemizole | Hismanal | 1977 | 1983 |
| R46541 | bromperidol decanoate | Impromen decanoas | 1978 | 1984 |
| R49945 | ketanserin tartrate | Sufrexal | 1980 | 1987 |
| R50547 | levocabastine | Livostin/Livocab | 1979 | 1989 |
| R51211 | itraconazole | Sporanox | 1980 | 1986 |
| R51619 | cisapride | Prepulsid | 1980 | 1989 |
| R64766 | risperidone | Risperdal | 1984 | 1993 |
| R207910 | bedaquiline | Sirturo | 2004 | 2012 |

Janssen Pharmaceuticals has developed and brought to the market about 70 new active substances (NCE), of which the most well-known are (name may differ):

- Imodium (against diarrhoea. Active substance: loperamide)
- Motilium (against flatulence and bowel impairments. Active substance: domperidone)
- Reminyl (against Alzheimer's disease (dementia). Active substance: galantamine)
- Daktarin (against fungal infections. Active substance: miconazole)
- Nizoral (against dandruff, Active substance: ketoconazole)
- Duragesic (fentanyl patch for pain suppression. Active substance: fentanyl)
- Vermox (against intestinal worms. Active substance: mebendazole)
- Risperdal (antipsychotic, against mental illness such as schizophrenia. Active substance: risperidone)

=== WHO Model List of Essential Medicines ===
Eight original Janssen drugs have been included on the WHO Model List of Essential Medicines:

- Imodium (loperamide)
- Haldol (haloperidol)
- Ergamisol (levamisole)
- Daktarin (miconazole)
- Vermox (mebendazole)
- Nizoral (ketoconazole) (Removed in 2005)
- Risperdal (risperidone)
- Sirturo (bedaquiline) – an diarylquinoline anti-tuberculosis drug, discovered by Koen Andries and his team, which promises a shorter and simpler treatment for multi-drug-resistant tuberculosis (MDR-TB).

=== Centocor products ===
In 1984, Centocor developed their first product approved by the U.S. Food and Drug Administration (FDA) – a diagnostic test used to detect the rabies virus.

In 1998, the company launched its top-selling monoclonal antibody Remicade (infliximab) for its first FDA approved indication in Crohn's disease. Subsequently, Remicade's market has expanded with approvals for rheumatoid arthritis, ankylosing spondylitis, psoriatic arthritis, ulcerative colitis, and pediatric Crohn's disease. Remicade was approved for plaque psoriasis in September 2006.

Centocor also markets ReoPro (abciximab), a biologic agent indicated as an adjunct to coronary angioplasty (PTCA).

In 2009, the U.S. FDA approved Simponi, a human monoclonal antibody for treatment for arthritis, which was co-developed with Medarex, Inc.

== Risperdal deception ==
In 2004, the United States Department of Justice began investigating sales practices surrounding the antipsychotic drug risperidone (Risperdal). In 2010, the agency joined a whistleblower suit alleging that despite being warned by the U.S. Food and Drug Administration not to promote Risperdal as effective and safe for elderly patients, in whom it was known to be associated with early death, Johnson & Johnson and Janssen Pharmaceuticals paid pharmacists at Omnicare, the largest supplier of pharmaceuticals to nursing homes, tens of millions of dollars in bribes and kickbacks to promote the drug to physicians for this unapproved use.

The lawsuit resulted in a 2012 provisional settlement totaling $2.3 billion, with Omnicare having already settled for around $100 million. Four states were awarded damages: Louisiana ($258 million in 2010), South Carolina ($327 million in 2011), Texas ($158 million in 2012), and Arkansas ($1.2 billion in 2012).

Former head of sales and president of Janssen Alex Gorsky, who according to the Department of Justice "was actively involved" in the fraud, became CEO of Johnson & Johnson in 2012.

== See also ==
- Janssen-Cilag
- Didier de Chaffoy de Courcelles
- Paul Stoffels
- Staf Van Reet
- Jan Schuurkes
- Tibotec
- Rega Institute for Medical Research
- Drug development
- Nanovid microscopy
- Joan Daemen
- Biotech and pharmaceutical companies in the New York metropolitan area
- List of companies of Belgium
- List of pharmaceutical companies
