= Faul =

Faul is a surname. Notable people with the surname include:

- Adam Faul (1929–2016), Canadian boxer
- Bill Faul (1909–1974), Australian rules footballer
- Bill Faul (baseball) (1940–2002), American baseball pitcher from Cincinnati, Ohio
- Denis Faul (1932–2006), Irish Roman Catholic priest
- Jan Faul (born 1945), American photographer
- Margaret Faul (fl. 1990s–present), American chemist

== See also ==
- Ulundi Airport (ICAO code: FAUL)
- Faul, part of the music duo formation Faul & Wad Ad
- Fauls Green, village in Shropshire, England
- Paul is dead
