= Pharmasset =

Pharmaceutical company

Pharmasset Inc.
- Industry: Pharmaceuticals
- Founded: 1998
- Defunct: 2012
- Fate: Acquired by Gilead Sciences in 2012
- Headquarters: Princeton, New Jersey, United States
- Key people: Raymond Schinazi; Dennis Liotta

Pharmasset Inc. was a pharmaceutical company based in Princeton, New Jersey in the United States. The company develops antiviral drugs for HIV (including racivir), hepatitis B (including clevudine, marketed as Levovir), and hepatitis C. In November 2011, Pharmasset was acquired by Gilead for $11.2 billion.

== History ==
Pharmasset was founded in 1998 by Raymond Schinazi and Dennis Liotta, scientists at Emory University. The company was initially incorporated in Barbados (as Pharmasset, Ltd.) and separately in Georgia. However, the company was redomiciled as a Delaware corporation on June 8, 2004.

Pharmasset's initial public offering took place on April 27, 2007, when it was first listed on NASDAQ. The firm's stock return in the first three fiscal quarters (nine months) of 2011 was 278 percent. Among analysts, 17 rated the company's stock as "strong buy" or "buy," while two rated it a "hold." Pharmasset was the best performer in this period among all major U.S. exchanges among stocks trading for at least $1.50 on January 1, 2011.

== Market ==
The company described itself as being a clinical-stage pharmaceutical company and stated that its primary focus is "the development of oral therapeutics for the treatment of hepatitis C virus." The company's secondary focus was the development of Racivir, an investigational antiretroviral drug for the treatment of HIV. The company's research and development concentrated on nucleoside analogs.

Pharmasset's PSI-7977 medication was further developed by Gilead and approved in December 2013 by the FDA as sofosbuvir (Sovaldi) for the treatment of chronic hepatitis C.

Among Pharmasset's competitors were Abbott Laboratories, Merck & Co., and Vertex Pharmaceuticals.

== Sovaldi ==
Pharmasset originally developed Sofosbuvir (brand name Sovaldi). When Gilead Sciences acquired Pharmasset for $11.2 billion in 2012, the "smaller company had forecast a $36,000 price per treatment course of Sovaldi. Gilead's investment bankers, Barclays and Bank of America Merrill Lynch did the "valuation of Pharmasset during merger talks and the related pricing assumptions for Sovaldi." According to The Wall Street Journal in response to the price of Solvadi at $84,000 per treatment course, the United States Senate Finance Committee wrote a letter to CEO John C. Martin questioning how much Pharmasset had spent on research and development on Sovaldi and how much Gilead spent on its "Sovaldi-related research costs since the 2012 buyout.
