= Jiaxing Huang =

Materials Chemistry researcher

Jiaxing Huang is a Chinese researcher, materials scientist, and chair professor of materials science at Westlake University. He is a fellow of the American Association for the Advancement of Science, and in 2016, he received the Humboldt Prize for research.

He is one of the most cited researchers. A paper he published in 2003 in the Journal of the American Chemical Society is one of the most cited paper in the field of Polymer chemistry.

== Education and career ==
Jiaxing obtained a degree in chemical physics from the University of Science and Technology of China and a doctorate degree in chemistry from the University of California. He was a faculty member at Northwestern University, where he became a full professor, before he joined Westlake University in 2021

He is chair professor of materials in the university's School of Engineering.

In 2014, he received the Guggenheim Fellowship, and in 2016, he received the Japan Society for the Promotion of Science Fellowship.

Since 2020, he is the editor-in-chief of Accounts of Materials Research, a journal published by American Chemical Society.
