= C8H10FN3O3S =

The molecular formula C_{8}H_{10}FN_{3}O_{3}S (molar mass: 247.24 g/mol, exact mass: 247.0427 u) may refer to:

- Emtricitabine (FTC)
- Racivir
