= Kai Rossen =

German chemist

Kai Rossen is a German chemist currently the editor-in-chief of American Chemical Society's Organic Process Research & Development since 2015. His research interests involve medical chemistry.

== Education ==
He earned his diploma in chemistry from the University of Düsseldorf, M.S. from University of North Carolina at Chapel Hill and his PhD from Cornell University. He has held positions at Merck, Sanofi and Degussa and Bayer.
