= ACS Synthetic Biology =

Scientific journal (created in 2012)

- Discipline: Synthetic biology, systems biology
- Language: English
- Edited by: Christopher Voigt

Publication details
- History: 2012-present
- Publisher: American Chemical Society (United States)
- Frequency: Monthly
- Impact factor: 5.110 (2020)

Standard abbreviations
- ISO 4: ACS Synth. Biol.

Indexing
- CODEN: ASBCD6
- ISSN: 2161-5063
- OCLC no.: 725876736

Links
- Journal homepage

ACS Synthetic Biology is a peer-reviewed scientific journal published by the American Chemical Society. It began publishing accepted articles in the Fall of 2011, with the first full monthly issue published in January 2012. It covers all aspects of synthetic biology, including molecular, systems, and synthetic research. The founding editor-in-chief is Christopher Voigt (Massachusetts Institute of Technology).

== Types of articles ==
The journal publishes

- Letters: Short reports of original research focused on an individual finding
- Articles: Original research presenting findings of immediate, broad interest.
- Reviews: Expert perspectives and analyses of recently published research
- Technical Notes: Concise communications that focus on the characterization of new or interesting tools and websites
- Tutorials: Detailed descriptions of synthetic, computational, and systems methodologies

== See also ==
- Systems and Synthetic Biology
