= Raymond Schinazi =

American organic medicinal chemist (born 1950)

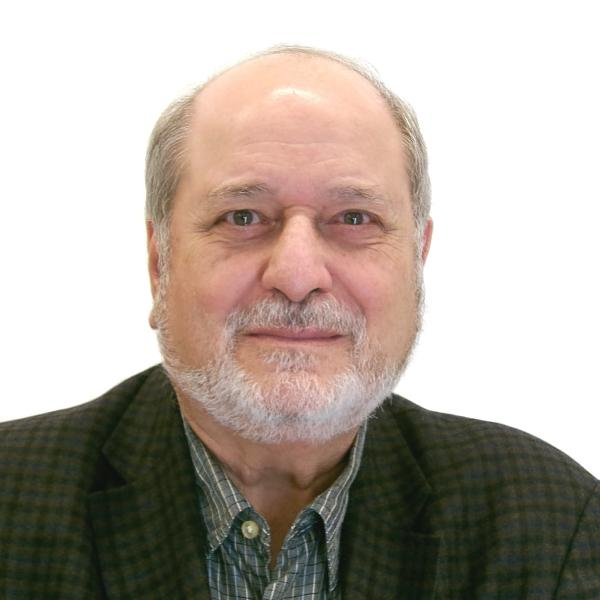
- Raymond F Schinazi
- Born: March 21, 1950 (age 76); Alexandria, Egypt
- Education: University of Bath
- Occupations: Organic Medicinal Chemist; Virologist; Pediatrician; Biotech Founder
- Writing career
- Language: English, French, Spanish, Arabic
- Subjects: Pharmacology; Virology & Immunology; Biotechnology
- Notable awards: Knight of the French Legion of Honour (Chevalier de la Légion d'honneur, 2018); Honorary Doctorate, Hebrew University of Jerusalem (2023); Honorary Doctorate in Medicine, Uppsala University (2025)

Raymond F. Schinazi (born 21 March 1950) is an Egyptian-born organic medicinal chemist. He is the Frances Winship Walters Professor of Pediatrics at Emory University. He has expertise in antiviral agents, pharmacology, and biotechnology. His research focuses on developing treatments for infections caused by human immunodeficiency virus (HIV), hepatitis B (HBV), hepatitis C (HCV), herpes, dengue fever, yellow fever, Mpox, norovirus, zika, chikungunya, and other emerging viruses. These treatment options include antiviral agents as well as synthetic, biochemical, pharmacological and molecular genetic approaches, including molecular modeling and gene therapy.

== Early life and education ==
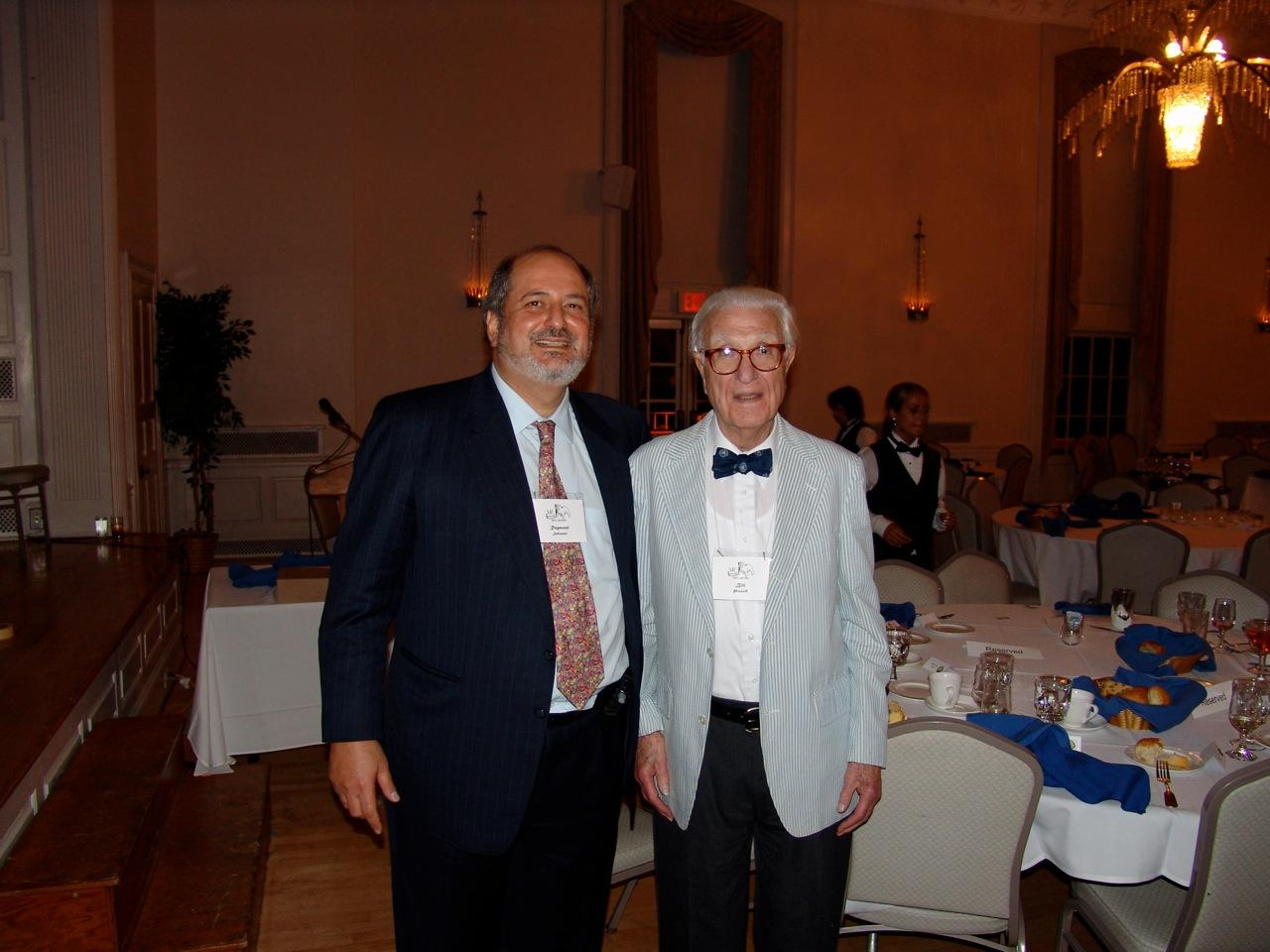
Schinazi with Yale mentor Dr William H Prusoff

Schinazi was born on March 21, 1950, in Alexandria, Egypt to Italian-Jewish parents. In 1962, his family was sequestered by the Nasser regime and in 1964 they immigrated to Naples, Italy as refugees. Schinazi went to boarding school at Carmel College, England, where he completed his early education before being admitted as an undergraduate at the University of Bath in 1968. He received his BSc in chemistry in 1972, and remained at Bath to complete his PhD in 1976. In 2006 he was awarded an honorary doctorate in Biotechnology from the University of Bath. In 1976, he moved to Yale University's department of pharmacology and trained as a postdoctoral fellow with William Prusoff.

He also completed postdoctoral trainings in virology at the University of Chicago with Bernard Roizman and at University of North Carolina with Yung-Chi Cheng, and virology/immunology at Emory University with André Nahmias.

== Career ==
Schinazi is currently the Frances Winship Walters Professor of Pediatrics, Director of the Laboratory of Biochemical Pharmacology at Emory University, where he has served since 1978. He also holds Adjunct Professor positions at both University of Georgia (Atlanta, GA) and University of Miami (Miami, Florida). He worked part-time for the Emory University affiliated Atlanta VA for 35 years while maintaining his Emory University appointment, retiring from the VA in 2016.

He began his work as a herpes virologist with a specific focus on developing drug therapeutics for orolabial and genital herpes and severe life-threatening infections like herpes encephalitis. When HIV was identified as a virus in the 1980s, Schinazi and his fellow researchers directed their attention towards the problem. He was able to translate his knowledge gained through his work on the herpes viruses towards addressing HIV and HBV. He is credited for setting up the first-ever HIV laboratory at Emory University complete with a protocol on how to handle the dangerous virus in the laboratory setting so he and his team could pursue the development of novel antiviral drugs. In 1987, he helped Prusoff's laboratory discover that d4T, a nucleoside analog, had selective activity against HIV.

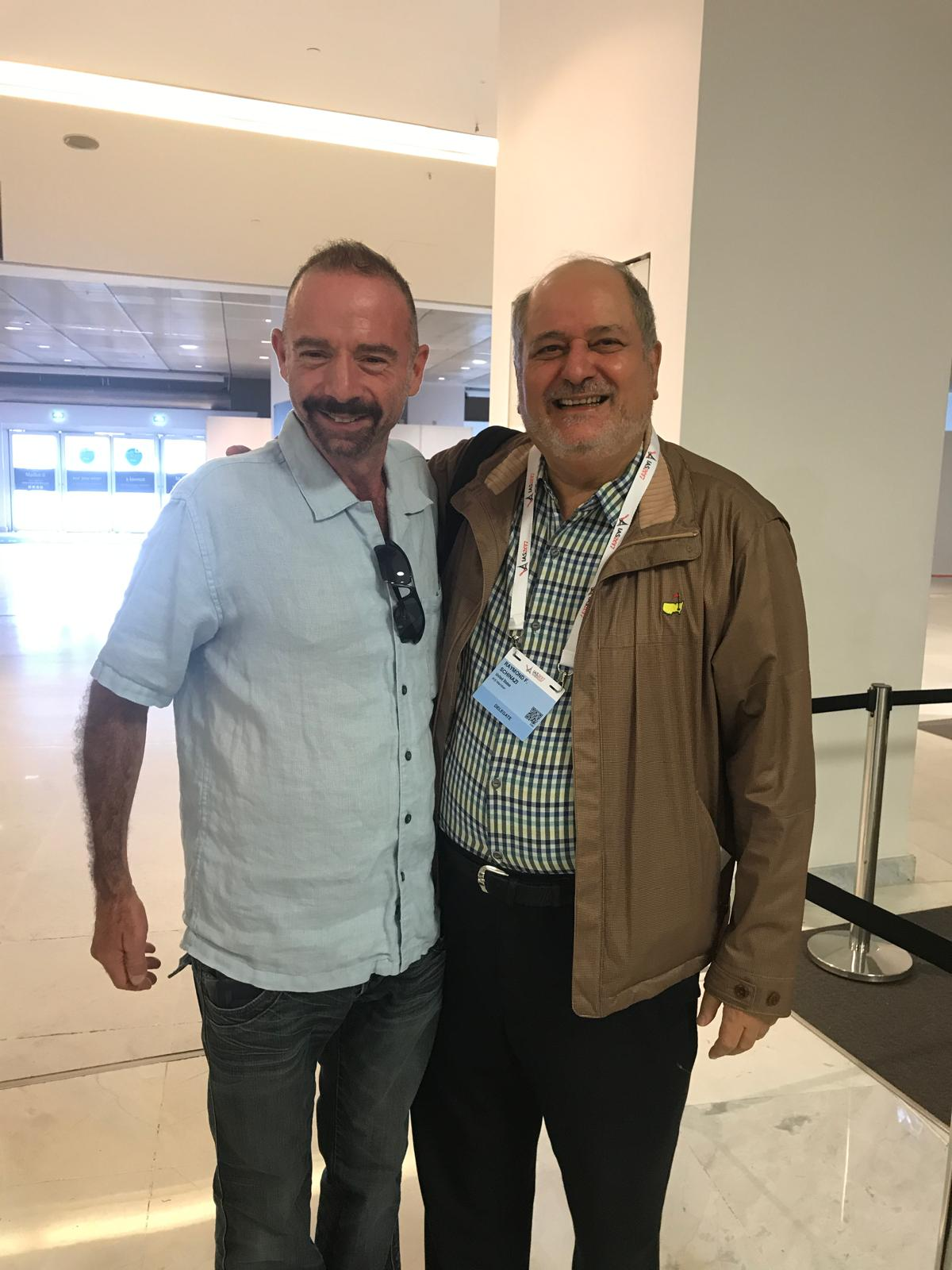
Schinazi with the famous Berlin Patient - the first person presumed cured of HIV

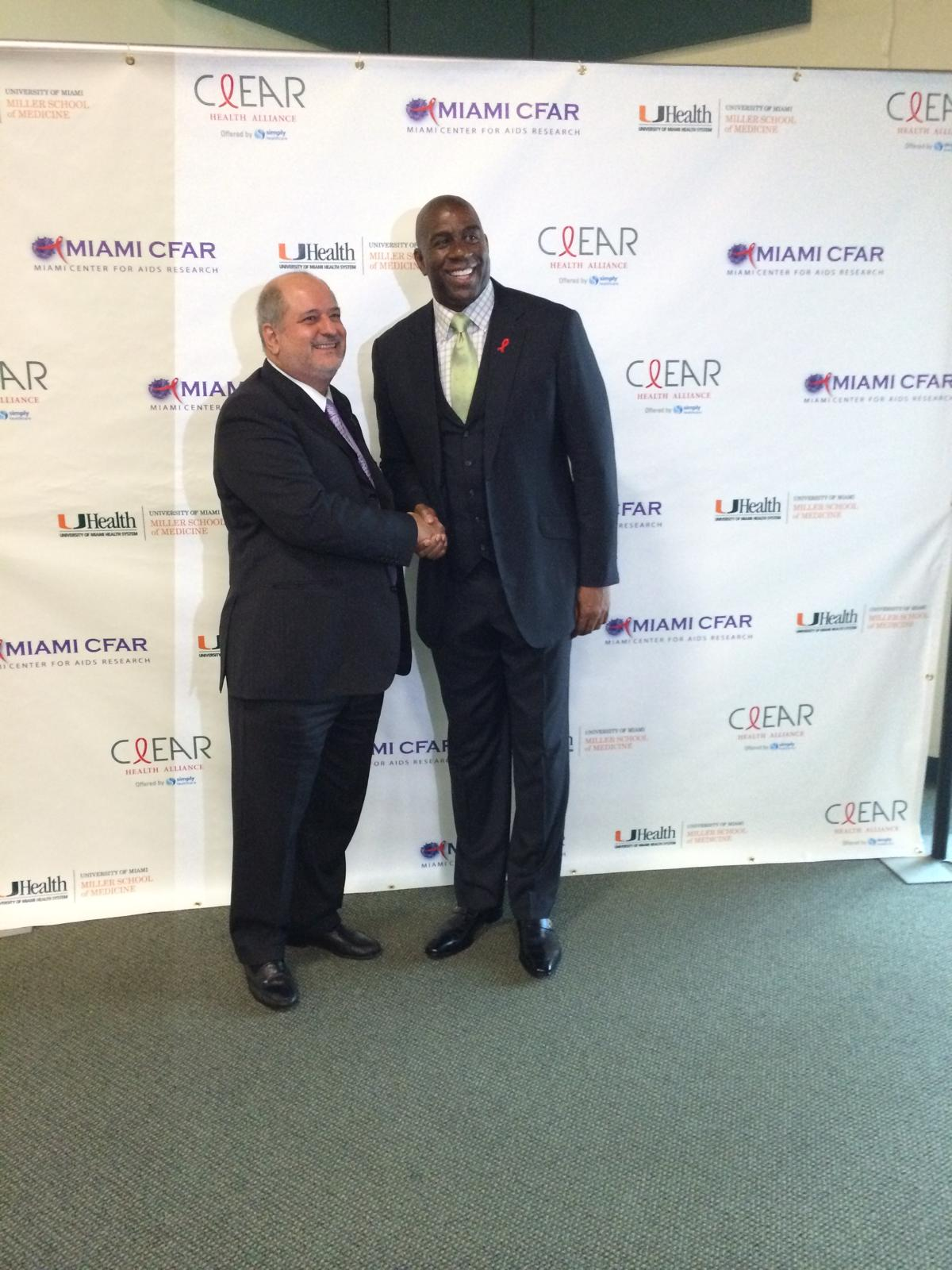
Raymond Schinazi with US basketball legend Magic Johnson, who has been living with HIV - with the aid of drugs Schinazi helped to discover and develop - since 1991

Schinazi is best known for his involvement in the discovery and development of innovative anti-HIV, HBV, and HCV drugs on the market. To date, he has been involved in the development of five FDA-approved drugs of which three are used in eight different drug combinations. More than 94% of HIV-positive people take at least one of the drugs he invented. He has authored more than 550 peer-reviewed papers in academic literature with over 20,000 total citations.

== Discovery and development of lamivudine (3TC) ==
Among the first drugs discovered and developed for treatment of HIV came through the collaboration between Dennis C. Liotta (Emory) and Schinazi. In 1992, they first published on lamivudine (3TC) in Antimicrobial Agents and Chemotherapy. This drug became one of the most successful antiviral agents used to combat HIV as part of fixed-dose combinations (including Combivir, Trizivir, Epzicom, and Triumeq). Combination therapies incorporating 3TC quickly became the standard of care, with safe and effective nucleoside reverse transcriptase (RF) inhibitors, such as 3TC and its related cousins, serving as the cornerstones of combination chemotherapy. 3TC was also found to be active against HBV in collaboration with Drs. Dennis Liotta, Philip Furman and Yung-Chi Cheng.

== Discovery and development of emtricitabine [(-)-FTC or FTC] ==
Schinazi's work led to the discovery of a second nucleoside analog, emtricitabine (FTC), subsequently resulting in a potent, safe nucleoside analog commonly used in treatment regimens. The discovery of FTC was first published in 1992 in Antimicrobial Agents and Chemotherapy as another new anti-HIV compound. The mechanism of action of FTC is by incorporation of FTC-TP into the growing viral DNA strand results in chain termination, disrupting viral DNA synthesis. Disruption of this process results in rapid reduction of systemic viral loads to undetectable in HIV-infected individuals, effectively allowing for significant rebound of CD4+ T-cells, effectively providing a tandem mechanism resulting in control of systemic viremia and restoration of functional immunity.

To secure the commercial rights to the compound, Gilead Sciences acquired Triangle Pharmaceuticals in 2003 for $464 million, subsequently marketing the drug under the brand name Emtriva. Triangle had originally licensed the molecule from Emory University in 1996, and was itself co-founded by Schinazi and Liotta in 1995 as a vehicle to develop their academic discoveries. In July 2005, Gilead teamed with Royalty Pharma to completely buy out Emory University's remaining royalty interests in emtricitabine for a one-time cash payment of $525 million. At the time of execution, the transaction stood as the largest intellectual property rights payoff in the history of American higher education, establishing an unprecedented valuation baseline for academic technology transfer to the pharmaceutical industry.

In addition, FTC in combination with tenofovir disoproxil fumarate (Truvada) was approved as a prophylactic drug (part of PrEP) to prevent transmission of HIV, further broadening its use beyond HIV-positive people to that of prophylaxis, underscoring a novel and previously unmet need with ramifications for global health worldwide. Today, this drug is widely used as part of fixed-dose combination drug regimens, including Truvada, Atripla, Complera, Stribild, Descovy, Genvoya, Odefsey, Descovy, Biktarvy, and Symtuza. Like 3TC, FTC was found to be active against HBV, but was never approved for this indication by the US FDA.

== Sofosbuvir (Sovaldi) ==
In 2004, Schinazi was the principal founder of Pharmasset, a company that would later go on to develop sofosbuvir. The name Pharmasset was derived from 'pharmaceutical assets' and the original business plan was to create assets that would be sold to other companies. The company raised around $45M in its 2007 IPO at $9 per share. It would later be taken over at $137 per share. In November 2011, Gilead Sciences announced a takeover bid for Pharmasset for approximately $11.4 billion.Gilead commercialized the compound under the trade name Sovaldi, which later served as the active therapeutic backbone for the pan-genotypic fixed-dose combination therapies Harvoni (sofosbuvir/ledipasvir) and Epclusa (sofosbuvir/velpatasvir).

Schinazi's contribution to the discovery of sofosbuvir is contentious. He is the co-author of a 2005 paper that discovered a precursor to the drug. Jean-Pierre Sommadossi, who co-founded both Pharmasset and Idenix with Schinazi, served as the principal founder of Idenix. In litigation between Idenix and Gilead/Pharmasset, there was an Order denying Idenix's motion for enhanced damages where the court noted that Schinazi "violated his confidentially obligations to Idenix, and shared with Pharmasset scientists Idenix's proprietary discoveries relating to treatment of HCV". However, even “fully accepting Idenix’s view of the evidence,” it was the company Schinazi founded, Pharmasset, not Idenix, that synthesized the key “compound that led to a cure for HCV.”. Even accepting that Idenix discovered a component of the compound, the cure for HCV was discovered only after Pharmasset/Gilead's ”revolutionary refinement of that invention.” Patent law, according to the order, reflects a balance between protection “and the importance of facilitating the imitation and refinement through imitation that are necessary to invention itself and the very lifeblood of a competitive economy.”

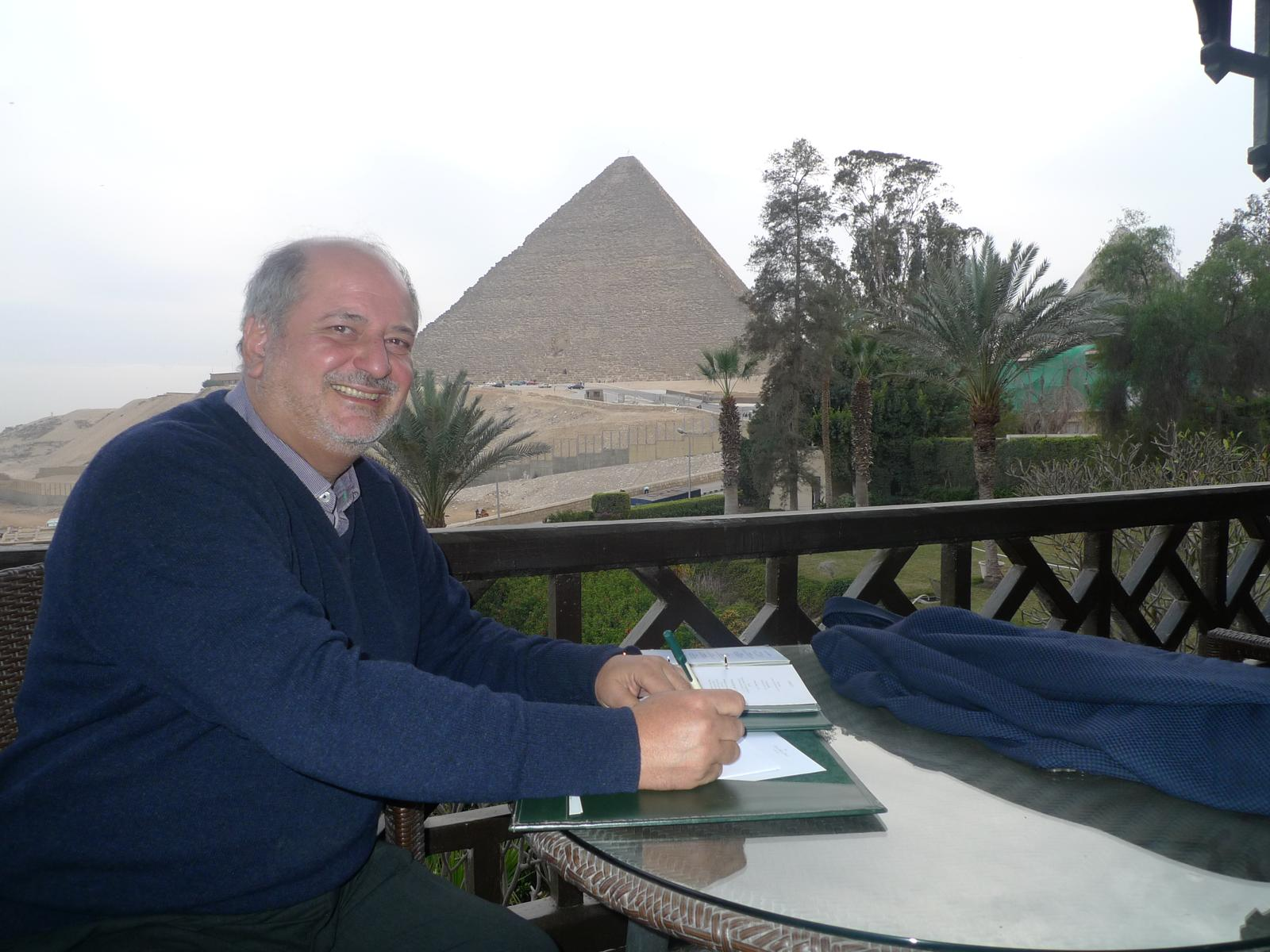
Schinazi returning to Egypt - for the first time in 50 years since his family fled the Nasser regime as refugees in 1964

In 2014, Schinazi, working with the Egyptian government and Gilead Sciences, agreed to provide Egypt with the drug Sofosbuvir (Sovaldi) for about US$1,000, which is only one percent of its market price. Also working with Pharco, an Egyptian Pharmaceutical company Sovaldi is now available for less than US$120 per cure.

Prior to the implementation of a nationwide screening and treatment program for hepatitis C in 2014, there were over 6 million Egyptians infected and living with the disease. But between 2014 and 2018, over 60 million people were screened and more than 4.1 million treated.

== Other drugs ==
Schinazi has also had a hand in the development of the other FDA-approved drugs stavudine and telbivudine.

== Honors and awards ==
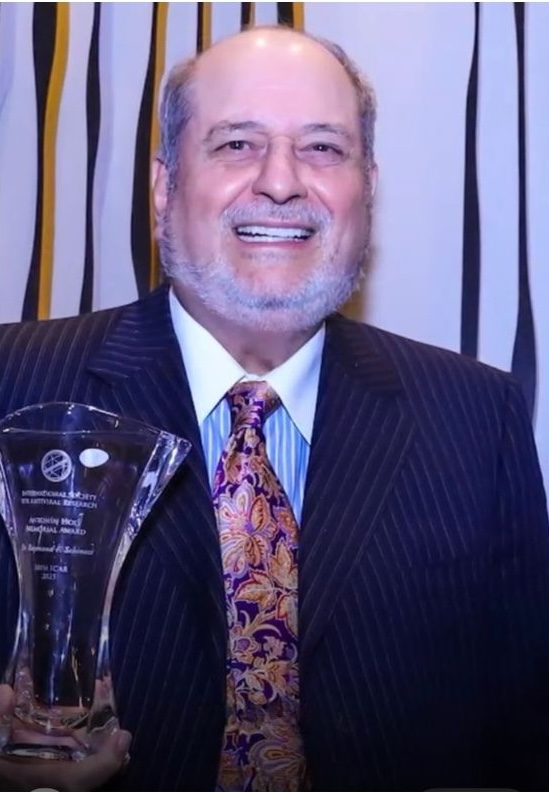
Schinazi receiving the 2025 Antonín Holý Award

In 2018, Schinazi received the Chevalier de la Légion d’honneur, the French Legion of Honor, with the rank of knight. Established in 1802 by Napoleon Bonaparte, it is the highest decoration bestowed in France and recognizes outstanding service to the French Republic.

In the years before and since, he has the recipient of numerous other awards, including: the Bruce Witte (Blumberg) Annual Distinguished Award- Hepatitis B Foundation (2000); the Georgia Biomedical Industry Growth Award (2003), Distinguished Scientist Award- Hepatitis B Foundation (2006); Emory University's Dean's Distinguished Faculty Lecture and Award (2008); Inductee- Technology Hall of Fame of Georgia (2011); Intellectual Property Legends Award - Georgia State University (2012); Charter Fellow- National Academy of Inventors (2013); Distinguished Medical Science Award- Friends of the National Library of Medicine (2013); Distinguished Scientific Achievement Award- American Liver Foundation (2014); Research & Hope Award for Excellence in Academic Research- PhRMA Foundation (2014); William S. Middleton Award- US Veterans Affairs (2015); Tom Glaser Leadership Award- Connexx Eagle Star Awards (2015); Lifetime Achievement Award- Scrip Award, London (2016); Lifetime Achievement Award for Public Service- Institute of Human Virology (2016);; Global Hepatitis Award from the International Symposium on Viral Hepatitis and Liver Disease (ISVHLD) 2018; Distinguished Achievement Award- American Association for the Study of Liver Diseases (AASLD)(2021).

Schinazi became a Fellow of the American Association for the Advancement of Science (AAAS) in 2020, and received an Honorary Doctorate (Doctor Philosophiae Honoris Causa) from the Hebrew University of Jerusalem in 2023. In the same year, Schinazi and colleagues received the "Deal of the Year" award from Emory's Office of Technology Transfer for their licensing agreement with Pfizer, Inc.

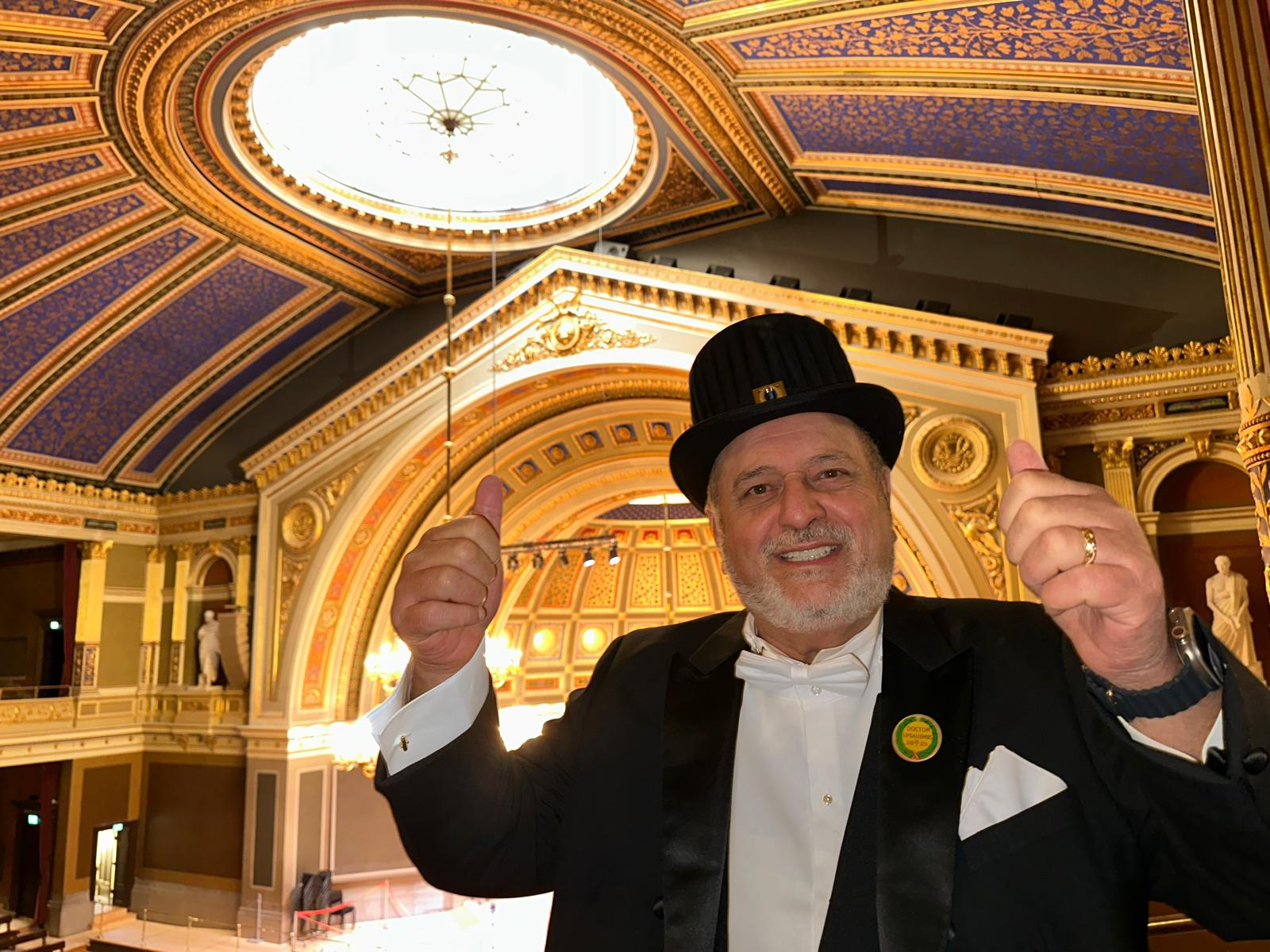
Schinazi receiving his honorary doctorate at Uppsala University, 2025

In 2025, he received the Antonín Holý Memorial Award from the International Society for Antiviral Research (ISAR) in recognition of his career-long prominence and achievements in antiviral drug discovery and development. In the same year, he was also inducted into the Georgia Technology Hall of Fame and received an Honorary Doctorate in Medicine from Uppsala University..

In 2026, he received the Emory University President's Medal alongside his colleagues Dennis Liotta and Woo-Baeg Choi, in recognition of their transformative contributions to global public health via life-saving HIV medications - estimated to be taken by over 90% of people living with HIV in the United States and by millions more worldwide.

== Podcast, radio, and online interviews ==
Schinazi has discussed his life, career and research in numerous podcast, radio, and video interviews, including the BBC Radio 4 programme The Life Scientific, The Road From Carmel, and the IAS-USA series Going Anti-Viral. He has also been featured in a two-part interview series for the University of Miami Miller School of Medicine's Inside U Miami Medicine podcast and a video interview with Dr. Michael Lederman and Dr. Neil Greenspan, Senior Editors of Pathogens and Immunity discussing his career in antiviral research.

Schinazi's role in developing the hepatitis C cure has also been discussed in broader media coverage of the sofosbuvir story, including a profile published in 2015 the journal Science entitled King of the Pills;, and a 2020 CNN interview with Pharco CEO Dr Sherine Helmy, which references Schinazi's role in hepatitis C eradication in Egypt.

== Founder ==
Schinazi has been a founder of:

- Triangle Pharmaceuticals, which was taken over by Gilead Sciences for $464 million in 2003
- Pharmasset, also acquired by Gilead for $11.4 billion in 2011
- Idenix Pharmaceuticals, taken over by Merck for $3.85 billion
- RFS Pharma, which merged with Cocrystal Pharma in 2014. RFS are the initials of Schinazi's name.

== Philanthropy ==
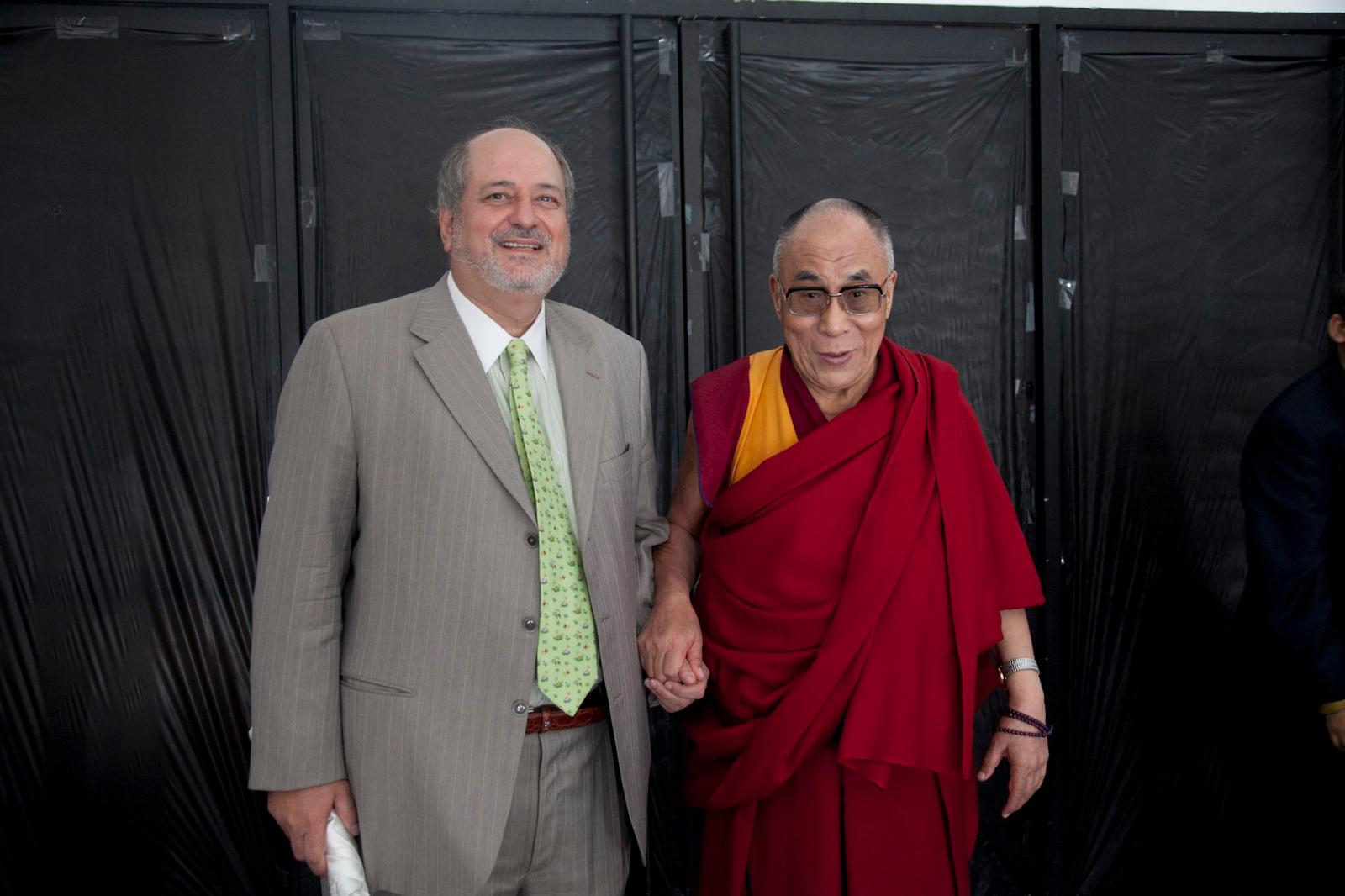
Schinazi at Emory University with the Dalai Lama - a Distinguished Professor at Emory since 2007

Schinazi has made substantial philanthropic contributions to various academic and cultural institutions. In 2022, he endowed the Raymond F. Schinazi and Family Endowed Chair in Biomedicine at the University of Miami Miller School of Medicine, installing visionary molecular virologist - and longtime friend and colleague - Dr. Mario Stevenson in support of his ongoing research toward a cure for HIV/AIDS. In 2023, Schinazi donated £2 million to the University of Bath, where he completed his undergraduate and doctoral degrees, to establish the Raymond Schinazi and Family Chair of Life Sciences - the first such chair in the university's new Department of Life Sciences.

He has also endowed multiple named chairs and professorships at Emory University, including the Nahmias-Schinazi Distinguished Professorship, the Schinazi Family Distinguished Professorship in Biomedical Research, the Barbara Stoll- and Lucky Jain-Raymond Schinazi Distinguished Professorships in Pediatrics, the Raymond F. Schinazi Distinguished Research Chair in Jewish Bioethics at the Emory Center for Ethics, and the Raymond F. Schinazi Scholarship in Bioethics and Jewish Thought,

Outside of academia, Schinazi funded the construction of the Eliyahu HaNavi Jewish Center in Cabo San Lucas, Mexico, named in honor of the historic synagogue in Alexandria, Egypt, that his family attended before being forced to flee in 1964. The center, which opened in November 2018, houses a synagogue, kosher dining, and accommodations for observant visitors.
