= Reagent Chemicals =

Publication of the American Chemical Society (ACS) Committee on Analytical Reagents

ACS Reagent Chemicals; Specifications and Procedures for Reagents and Standard Grade Reference Materials
- Author: American Chemical Society
- Release number: 11th edition
- Publisher: American Chemical Society, Oxford University Press
- Publication date: 1950; 2016
- Media type: Print; electronic
- Pages: 843
- ISBN: 9780841230453
- Website: pubs.acs.org/series/reagents

Reagent Chemicals (Note: more properly ACS Reagent Chemicals; Specifications and Procedures for Reagents and Standard Grade Reference Materials) is a publication of the American Chemical Society (ACS) Committee on Analytical Reagents, detailing standards of purity for over four hundred of the most widely used chemicals in laboratory analyses and chemical research. Chemicals that meet this standard may be sold as "ACS Reagent Grade" materials.

Reagent standards relieve chemists of concern over chemical purity. "ACS Reagent Grade", is regarded as a gold standard measure and is in some cases required for use in chemical manufacturing, usually where stringent quality specifications and a purity of equal to or greater than 95% are required. The American Chemical Society does not validate the purity of chemicals sold with this designation, but it relies on suppliers, acting in their self-interest, to meet these standards. In practice, the reliability of supplier stated purity is at times questionable.

In addition to specifications for each chemical, Reagent Chemicals provides detailed methods for determining how to measure the properties and impurities listed in the specifications. Included are detailed explanations for numerous common analytical methods such as gas, liquid, ion, and headspace chromatography, atomic absorption spectroscopy, and optical emission spectroscopy.

Reagent Chemicals is primarily of interest to manufacturers and suppliers of chemicals to laboratories worldwide, and less so to research laboratories. Many standards organizations and federal agencies that set guidelines require the use of ACS-grade regent chemicals for many test procedures. This includes the United States Pharmacopeia (USP) and the U.S. Environmental Protection Agency (EPA). An exception would be those working on trace analyses (measuring contaminants in the environment, for example), where small impurities in reagents would be significant.

== Reagent Chemicals Online ==
After eleven paper editions over 68 years, Reagent Chemicals became an electronic resource in 2017. The publication is updated several times a year to include new reagents and methods of analysis. Changes are published online six months prior to becoming an official standard, allowing manufacturers to adjust their labels or processes.

While the full details of most reagents are behind a paywall, that for acetone is publicly available to showcase a typical entry.

== History of Reagent Chemicals ==
- 1903: The American Chemical Society created the Committee on the Purity of Reagents, the forerunner of the Committee on Analytical Reagents, acknowledging the increasing needs for purity and standard in chemical research and manufacturing.
- 1917: The American Chemical Society established the ACS Committee on Analytical Reagents. William F. Hillebrand (1853-1925), one of Washington's most distinguished chemists, was elected as the first chair. He played a key editorial role in judging which analytical methods would be published as ACS standards, with colleagues referring to him as "Supreme Court of Chemistry". He additionally achieved stature with Geological Survey and the Bureau of Standards.
- 1920s: The Committee began publishing specifications for chemical reagents and test methods in scientific journals. At this point, analytical methods were primarily what we now consider to be “Classical Wet Methods".
- 1950: The 1st edition of Reagent Chemicals was published and introduced the application of analytical instrumentation. Reagent Chemicals had significant impact on chemical laboratories by enabling greatly improved accuracy and sensitivity.
- 2000: The 9th edition was published and continued a trend toward eliminating or simplifying tedious classical procedures for trace analyses and adding instrumental methods, where possible.
- 2006: The release of the 10th edition introduced Monographs for Standard-Grade Reference Materials.
- 2016: The 11th edition introduces heavy metal test methodologies utilizing ICP-OES.
- 2017: The new online edition of Reagent Chemicals, based on the 11th edition in print, improved the speed and simplicity with which the Committee communicates updates and changes by bringing the entire reference resource to the ACS journals platform.

== Committee ==
The ACS Committee on Analytical Reagents is responsible for the Reagent Chemicals publication and standards included within. The committee includes members from chemical and pharmaceutical manufacturers, academia, and government organizations (NIST, EPA, USGS).
