= Chemical purity =

Measure of the amount of impurities in a chemical sample

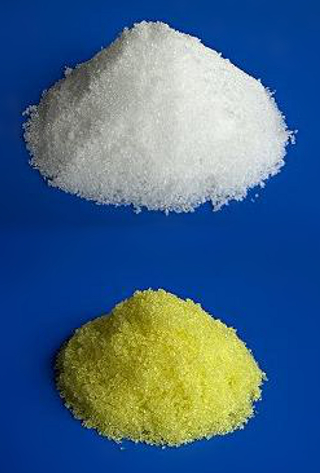
Aluminium trichloride hexahydrate, white and yellow

In chemistry, chemical purity is the measurement of the amount of impurities found in a sample. Several grades of purity are used by the scientific, pharmaceutical, and industrial communities. Some of the commonly used grades of purity include:

- ACS grade is the highest level of purity, and meets the standards set by the American Chemical Society (ACS). The official descriptions of the ACS levels of purity is documented in the Reagent Chemicals publication, issued by the ACS. It is suitable for food and laboratory uses.
- Reagent grade is almost as stringent as the ACS grade.
- USP grade meets the purity levels set by the United States Pharmacopeia (USP). USP grade is equivalent to the ACS grade for many drugs.
- NF grade is a purity grade set by the National Formulary (NF). NF grade is equivalent to the ACS grade for many drugs.
- British Pharmacopoeia: Meets or exceeds requirements set by the British Pharmacopoeia (BP). Can be used for food, drug, and medical purposes, and also for most laboratory purposes.
- Japanese Pharmacopeia: Meets or exceeds requirements set by the Japanese Pharmacopoeia (JP). Can be used for food, drug, and medical purposes, and also for most laboratory purposes.
- Laboratory grade is suitable for use in educational settings, but is not acceptable for food or drug use.
- Purified grade is not precisely defined, and it is not suitable for drug or food usage.
- Technical grade is suitable for industrial applications, but is not acceptable for food or drug use.
