= Margaret Faul =

Irish American chemist

Margaret M. Faul
- Education: University College Dublin; Harvard University
- Known for: Green chemistry, process science
- Scientific career
- Workplaces: Eli Lilly; Amgen
- Thesis: I. The asymmetric synthesis of chiral organosulfur compounds using N-(sulfinyl)-oxazolidinones; II. The development of the asymmetric copper-catalyzed aziridination reaction (1992)
- Doctoral advisor: David A. Evans

Margaret M. Faul is an Irish American chemist and executive who has won multiple awards for innovations in process chemistry.

== Background ==
Faul received her undergraduate degrees from University College, Dublin before embarking on doctoral studies with Professor David A. Evans at Harvard. Her studies focused mostly on metal-catalyzed nitrene transfer reactions to produce aziridines, strained nitrogen precursors valued as pharmaceutical intermediates. Faul introduced multiple new wrinkles into this chemistry, including using chiral copper(I) catalysts to produce enantiomerically enriched aziridines, and using a variety of different nitrene sources for the transfer.

== Research ==
Faul joined the process chemistry group at Eli Lilly in 1993, and joined Amgen's process group in 2003, rising eventually to its executive director. According to a biosketch at Organic Syntheses, Faul has expertise in Good Manufacturing Process scale-up of both chemical and biological therapeutics, and coordinates groups of external partners through licensing, regulatory, and program development issues. She attributes much of Amgen's success in this area to early adoption of new technologies, such as supercritical carbon dioxide purification and ultra-high performance liquid chromatography (uPLC).

== Volunteer work ==
Faul is an editorial board member at the Thieme journal Science of Synthesis and Editor-in-Chief at the ACS journal Organic Process Research and Development. She has served as the chair of the Enabling Technologies Consortium.

== Awards and honors ==
- 2019 - Fellow of the American Chemical Society (ACS)
- 2019 - Inaugural Margaret M. Faul Women in Chemistry Award, Thieme Publishers
- 2018 - Earl B. Barnes award for Chemical Research Management, ACS
- 2017 - Accepted the Presidential Green Chemistry Challenge award on behalf of Amgen Process
- 1986 - Hugh Ryan Memorial Medal, UCD
