= ACS Applied Nano Materials =

Scientific journal

- Discipline: Nanomaterials
- Language: English
- Edited by: Xing Yi Ling

Publication details
- History: 2018—present
- Publisher: American Chemical Society
- Frequency: Weekly
- Impact factor: 5.5 (2024)

Standard abbreviations
- ISO 4: ACS Appl. Nano Mater.

Indexing
- CODEN: AANMF6
- ISSN: 2574-0970

Links
- Journal homepage; Online access; Online archive

ACS Applied Nano Materials is a peer-reviewed scientific journal published weekly by American Chemical Society. Established in 2018, it covers research on fundamental science and applications of nanomaterials. Its current editor-in-chief is Xing Yi Ling (Nanyang Technological University).

== Abstracting and indexing ==
The journal is abstracted and indexed in:

- Chemical Abstracts Core
- Current Contents/Engineering, Computing & Technology
- Current Contents/Physical, Chemical & Earth Sciences
- Ei Compendex
- Science Citation Index Expanded
- Scopus

According to the Journal Citation Reports, the journal has a 2024 impact factor of 5.5.
