= Molecular Pharmaceutics =

- Discipline: Pharmacology, pharmacy
- Language: English
- Edited by: Lynne S. Taylor

Publication details
- History: 2004-present
- Publisher: American Chemical Society (United States)
- Frequency: Monthly
- Impact factor: 5.364 (2021)

Standard abbreviations
- ISO 4: Mol. Pharm.

Indexing
- CODEN: MPOHBP
- ISSN: 1543-8384 (print); 1543-8392 (web)
- LCCN: 2003212143
- OCLC no.: 51797065

Links
- Journal homepage; Online access; Online archive

Molecular Pharmaceutics is a peer-reviewed scientific journal covering research on the molecular mechanistic understanding of drug delivery and drug delivery systems, including physical and pharmaceutical chemistry, biochemistry and biophysics, molecular and cellular biology, and polymer and materials science.

== Background ==
First published in 2004 by the American Chemical Society, it is considered one of the most prestigious journals in the field of pharmaceutics, physical pharmacy and drug delivery. Its publication frequency switched from bimonthly to monthly in 2012. According to the Journal Citation Reports, the journal has a 2021 impact factor of 5.364. The current editor-in-chief is Lynne S. Taylor, who is preceded founding editor-in-chief Gordon L. Amidon.

Molecular Pharmaceutics publishes reviews, research articles, brief articles, and communications.

== Abstracting and indexing ==
The journal is abstracted and indexed in

- Chemical Abstracts Service
- Scopus
- EBSCOhost
- PubMed
- CABI
- Web of Science
- ProQuest
- SwetsWise
