= IC50 =

Half maximal inhibitory concentration

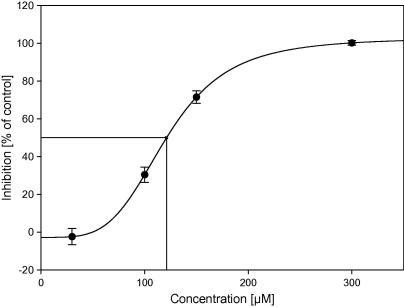
Graphical representation of the IC_{50} determination of the inhibition of an enzyme's activity by a small molecule ("drug"). Four different concentrations of the small molecule (ranging from 30 to 300 μM) were tested.

Half maximal inhibitory concentration (IC_{50}) is a measure of the potency of a substance in inhibiting a specific biological or biochemical function. IC_{50} is a quantitative measure that indicates how much of a particular inhibitory substance (e.g. drug) is needed to inhibit, in vitro, a given biological process or biological component by 50%. The biological component could be an enzyme, cell, cell receptor or microbe. IC_{50} values are typically expressed as molar concentration.

IC_{50} is commonly used as a measure of antagonist drug potency in pharmacological research. IC_{50} is comparable to other measures of potency, such as EC_{50} for excitatory drugs. EC_{50} represents the dose or plasma concentration required for obtaining 50% of a maximum effect in vivo.

IC_{50} can be determined with functional assays or with competition binding assays.

Sometimes, IC_{50} values are converted to the pIC_{50} scale.

$$\ce{pIC_{50}} = -\log_{10} \ce{(IC_{50})}$$

Due to the minus sign, higher values of pIC_{50} indicate exponentially more potent inhibitors. pIC_{50} is usually given in terms of molar concentration (mol/L, or M), thus requiring IC_{50} in units of M.

The IC_{50} terminology is also used for some behavioral measures in vivo, such as the two bottle fluid consumption test. When animals decrease consumption from the drug-laced water bottle, the concentration of the drug that results in a 50% decrease in consumption is considered the IC_{50} for fluid consumption of that drug.

== Functional antagonist assay ==
The IC_{50} of a drug can be determined by constructing a dose-response curve and examining the effect of different concentrations of antagonist on reversing agonist activity. IC_{50} values can be calculated for a given antagonist by determining the concentration needed to inhibit half of the maximum biological response of the agonist. IC_{50} values can be used to compare the potency of two antagonists.

IC_{50} values are very dependent on conditions under which they are measured. In general, a higher concentration of inhibitor leads to lowered agonist activity. IC_{50} value increases as agonist concentration increases. Furthermore, depending on the type of inhibition, other factors may influence IC_{50} value; for ATP dependent enzymes, IC_{50} value has an interdependency with concentration of ATP, especially if inhibition is competitive.

== IC_{50} and affinity ==
=== Competition binding assays ===
In this type of assay, a single concentration of radioligand (usually an agonist) is used in every assay tube. The ligand is used at a low concentration, usually at or below its K_{d} value. The level of specific binding of the radioligand is then determined in the presence of a range of concentrations of other competing non-radioactive compounds (usually antagonists), in order to measure the potency with which they compete for the binding of the radioligand. Competition curves may also be computer-fitted to a logistic function as described under direct fit.

In this situation the IC_{50} is the concentration of competing ligand which displaces 50% of the specific binding of the radioligand. The IC_{50} value is converted to an absolute inhibition constant K_{i} using the Cheng–Prusoff equation formulated by Yung-Chi Cheng and William Prusoff (see K_{i}).

=== Cheng–Prusoff equation ===
IC_{50} is not a direct indicator of affinity, although the two can be related at least for competitive agonists and antagonists by the Cheng-Prusoff equation. For enzymatic reactions, this equation is:

$$K_i = \frac\ce{IC50}{1+\frac{[S]}{K_m}}$$

where K_{i} is the binding affinity of the inhibitor, IC_{50} is the functional strength of the inhibitor, [S] is fixed substrate concentration and K_{m} is the Michaelis constant i.e. concentration of substrate at which enzyme activity is at half maximal (but is frequently confused with substrate affinity for the enzyme, which it is not).

Alternatively, for inhibition constants at cellular receptors:

$$K_i = \frac\ce{IC50}{\frac{[A]}\ce{EC50}+1}$$

where [A] is the fixed concentration of agonist and EC_{50} is the concentration of agonist that results in half maximal activation of the receptor. Whereas the IC_{50} value for a compound may vary between experiments depending on experimental conditions, (e.g. substrate and enzyme concentrations) the K_{i} is an absolute value. K_{i} is the inhibition constant for a drug; the concentration of competing ligand in a competition assay which would occupy 50% of the receptors if no ligand were present.

The Cheng–Prusoff equation produces good estimates at high agonist concentrations, but over- or under-estimates K_{i} at low agonist concentrations. In these conditions, other analyses have been recommended.

== See also ==
- Certain safety factor
- EC_{50} (half maximal effective concentration)
- LD_{50} (median lethal dose)
- K_{i} (equilibrium constant)
