= Racivir =

Medication

Clinical data
- Routes of administration: Investigational
- ATC code: none

Identifiers
- IUPAC name: 4-amino-5-fluoro-1-[(2S,5R)-2-(hydroxymethyl)-1,3-oxathiolan-5-yl]-1,2-dihydropyrimidin-2-one
- CAS Number: 137530-41-7
- PubChem CID: 454858
- ChemSpider: 400521
- UNII: 9PDN1V466A
- NIAID ChemDB: 005245
- CompTox Dashboard (EPA): DTXSID701288260

Chemical and physical data
- Formula: C_{8}H_{10}FN_{3}O_{3}S
- Molar mass: 247.24 g·mol^{−1}
- 3D model (JSmol): Interactive image
- SMILES: c1c(c(nc(=O)n1[C@H]2CS[C@H](O2)CO)N)F
- InChI: InChI=1S/C8H10FN3O3S/c9-4-1-12(8(14)11-7(4)10)5-3-16-6(2-13)15-5/h1,5-6,13H,2-3H2,(H2,10,11,14)/t5-,6+/m1/s1; Key:XQSPYNMVSIKCOC-RITPCOANSA-N

Racivir is an experimental nucleoside reverse transcriptase inhibitor (NRTI), developed by Pharmasset for the treatment of HIV. It is the enantiomer of emtricitabine, a widely used NRTI, meaning that the two compounds are mirror images of each other.

Emtricitabine, the enantiomer of racivir and a widely used NRTI
