= ACS Medicinal Chemistry Letters =

- Discipline: Medicinal chemistry
- Language: English
- Edited by: Dennis C. Liotta

Publication details
- History: 2009–present
- Publisher: American Chemical Society (United States)
- Frequency: Monthly
- Open access: Hybrid
- Impact factor: 4.632 (2021)

Standard abbreviations
- ISO 4: ACS Med. Chem. Lett.

Indexing
- CODEN: AMCLCT
- ISSN: 1948-5875
- LCCN: 2009200243
- OCLC no.: 455500725

Links
- Journal homepage; Online access; Online archive

ACS Medicinal Chemistry Letters is a monthly peer-reviewed scientific journal covering medicinal chemistry. It was established in 2009 and is published by the American Chemical Society. The editor-in-chief is Dennis C. Liotta (Emory University).

According to the Journal Citation Reports, the journal has a 2021 impact factor of 4.632.
