= ACS Organic & Inorganic Au =

- Discipline: Organic chemistry, Inorganic chemistry, Catalytic chemistry,Organometallic chemistry, natural product chemistry
- Language: English
- Edited by: Shelley D. Minteer

Publication details
- History: 2021–present
- Publisher: ACS (USA)
- Frequency: Bimonthly
- Impact factor: 5.2 (2025)

Standard abbreviations
- ISO 4: ACS Org. Inorg. Au

Indexing
- ISSN: 2694-247X
- OCLC no.: 1198452135

Links
- Journal homepage; Online access

ACS Organic & Inorganic Au is a bimonthly peer-reviewed open access scientific journal established in 2021 by ACS. This journal covers theoretical and experimental research on organic, organometallic, inorganic, crystal growth and engineering, and organic process chemistry.

The editor-in-chief of the journal is Shelley D. Minteer from Missouri University of Science and Technology.
