= Organic Process Research & Development =

- Discipline: Process chemistry
- Language: English
- Edited by: Margaret Faul

Publication details
- History: 1997–present
- Publisher: American Chemical Society (United States)
- Frequency: Monthly
- Impact factor: 3.858 (2021)

Standard abbreviations
- ISO 4: Org. Process Res. Dev.

Indexing
- CODEN: oprdfk
- ISSN: 1083-6160 (print); 1520-586X (web)

Links
- Journal homepage

Organic Process Research & Development is a peer-reviewed scientific journal published since 1997 by the American Chemical Society. Its publication frequency switched from bimonthly to monthly in 2012. It is indexed in Chemical Abstracts Service, Scopus, EBSCOhost, British Library, and Web of Science. The current Editor-in-Chief is Margaret Faul, taking over the role from Kai Rossen in 2025. According to the Journal Citation Reports, the journal has a 2021 impact factor of 3.858.
