= National Chemistry Week =

Annual celebration of chemistry in the United States

National Chemistry Week (NCW) is an annual event held in the United States to raise public awareness of the importance of chemistry in everyday life. It is coordinated by the American Chemical Society (ACS).

NCW is a community-based program that unites ACS local sections, businesses, schools, and individuals in communicating the importance of chemistry to our quality of life.

NCW has won the American Society of Association Executives' Award for Excellence. More than 10,000 volunteers and dozens of chemical companies donate their time, creativity, materials and funds for NCW each year, and reach many millions of Americans via print, radio, television, and the internet, as well as in person.

== Origins ==
National Chemistry Day, first celebrated in 1987 by members of the American Chemical Society (ACS), educators and other individual volunteers, was a vision of the former ACS President Dr. George C. Pimentel. His goal was for ACS to hold a simultaneous event nationwide to impress on the public the importance of chemistry in everyday life. The first celebration was kicked off with a parade down the streets in Washington, D.C.

In 1989 the celebration was expanded to a biannual full-week event, and in 1993 National Chemistry Week became an annual celebration.

== Themes ==
Past and future themes for NCW include:

	Theme
1997 (Nov 2–8)	Planet Chemistry
1998 (Nov 1–7)	A World of Color
1999 (Nov 7–13)	A Global Salute to Polymers (International Chemistry Celebration)
2000 (Nov 5–11)	Get Cooking with Chemistry
2001 (Nov 4–10)	Celebrating Chemistry & Art
2002 (Oct 20–26)	Chemistry Keeps Us Clean!
2003 (Oct 19–25)	Earth's Atmosphere and Beyond
2004 (Oct 17–23)	Health and Wellness
2005 (Oct 16–22)	The Joy of Toys
2006 (Oct 22–28)	Your Home — It's All Built on Chemistry
2007 (Oct 21–27)	The Many Faces of Chemistry
2008 (Oct 19–25)	Having a Ball with Chemistry
2009 (Oct 18–24)	Chemistry — It's Elemental!
2010 (Oct 17–23)	Behind the Scenes with Chemistry
2011 (Oct 16–22)	Chemistry—Our Health, Our Future!
2012 (Oct 21–27)	Nanotechnology: The Smallest BIG Idea in Science!
2013 (Oct 20–26)	Energy: Now and Forever!
2014 (Oct 19–25)	The Sweet Side of Chemistry — Candy
2015 (Oct 18–24)	Chemistry Colors Our World
2016 (Oct 16–22)	Solving Mysteries Through Chemistry
2017 (Oct 22–28)	Chemistry Rocks!
2018 (Oct 21–27)	Chemistry is Out of This World
2019 (Oct 20–26)	Marvelous Metals
2020 (Oct 18–24)	Sticking with Chemistry
2021 (Oct 17–23)	Fast or Slow...Chemistry Makes it Go!
2022 (Oct 16–22)	Fabulous Fibers: The Chemistry of Fabrics!
2023 (Oct 15-21)	The Healing Power of Chemistry
2024 (Oct 6-26)	Picture Perfect Chemistry
