= Division of Chemical Health and Safety =

Part of the American Chemical Society

- Formation: 1979
- Headquarters: Washington, D.C.
- Location: United States
- Members: 1,700
- Official language: English
- Parent organization: American Chemical Society
- Website: www.dchas.org

The Division of Chemical Health and Safety (DCHAS) is a technological department of the American Chemical Society (ACS) that concentrates on health and safety within the field of chemistry. Founded in 1979 in Washington, D.C., DCHAS works with many sister organizations, including the ACS Committee on Chemical Safety, AIChE's Center for Process Safety, Campus Safety, the Health and Environmental Association, and the AIHA Laboratory Safety Committee.

== Awards ==
The awards provided by DCHAS include:

- Howard Fawcett Chemical Health and Safety Award: An award for individual contributions to the field of chemical health and safety.
- SafetyStratus College and University Health and Safety Award: An award for comprehensive chemical safety programs in higher education (undergraduate study only).
- Tillmanns-Skolnik Award: An award for long-term service to the Division of Chemical Health and Safety.
- CHAS Student Registration Award: An award providing reimbursement in the amount of a full-conference registration fee (undergraduate, graduate, or pre-college teacher-student rate, as applicable).
- Laboratory Safety Institute Graduate Research Faculty Safety Award: An award to graduate-level academic research faculty who demonstrate commitment to chemical health and safety in their laboratories.
- Service Awards: An award given to encourage student participation in CHAS programming at ACS national meetings.
- CHAS Fellows Award: An award is given for a lifetime of dedication and service to the American Chemical Society, the ACS Division of Chemical Health and Safety, and the chemical health and safety field.
