= Chemical Research in Toxicology =

- Discipline: Chemistry, toxicology
- Language: English
- Edited by: Shana J. Sturla

Publication details
- History: 1988-present
- Publisher: American Chemical Society (United States)
- Frequency: Monthly
- Impact factor: 4.1 (2022)

Standard abbreviations
- ISO 4: Chem. Res. Toxicol.

Indexing
- CODEN: CRTOEC
- ISSN: 0893-228X (print); 1520-5010 (web)

Links
- Journal homepage

Chemical Research in Toxicology is a peer-reviewed scientific journal, published since 1988 by the American Chemical Society. It is currently abstracted and indexed in Chemical Abstracts Service, Scopus, EBSCOhost, PubMed, CABI, Science Citation Index Expanded, and SwetsWise.

As of January 2018, the editor-in-chief is Shana Sturla (Institute of Food, Nutrition, and Health Department of Health Sciences and Technology ETH Zurich).

According to the Journal Citation Reports, the journal had a 2022 impact factor of 4.1.
