= Dennis C. Liotta =

American chemist

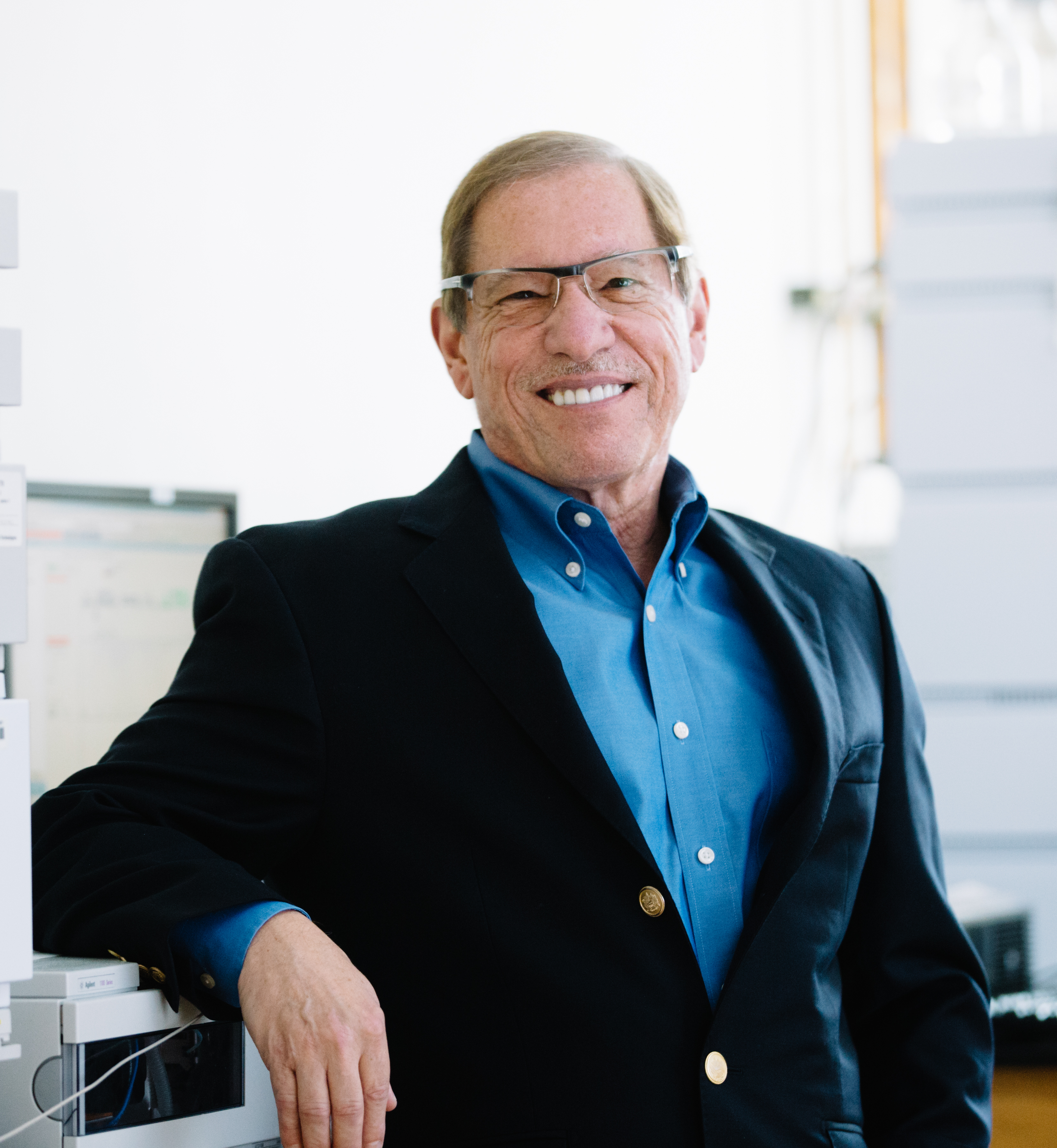
Dennis Liotta at Emory University.

Dennis Liotta is a chemistry professor at Emory University in Atlanta, Georgia, United States. He is noted for his work on the development of antiviral drugs.

== Career ==
Liotta's fields of research are organic synthesis and medicinal chemistry. Along with Dr. Raymond F. Schinazi and Dr. Woo-Baeg Choi of Emory, he invented Emtricitabine, which is a breakthrough HIV drug. Emory University sold its royalties on the drug to Royalty Pharma and Gilead Sciences in July 2005 for $525 million. It is currently marketed under the name Emtriva. Emtriva is a component of a number of combination therapies used to treat HIV, including Truvada, Atripla, Complera, Stribild, Genvoya, Odefesey, Biktarvy, Descovy, and Symtuza. Truvada is the only combination therapy approved for Pre-Exposure Prophylaxis (PrEP). Liotta, Choi and Schinazi also co-invented Epivir (lamivudine), which is a component of multiple combination therapies such as Combivir, Trizivir, Epzicom, Triumeq, Dutrebis and Delstrigo. It is estimated that >90% of HIV infected patients in the US take or have taken drug combinations that include either Emtriva or Epivir. In addition, he was one of the inventors of Epivir-HBV, the first drug approved to treat hepatitis B infections.

Liotta has also co-invented other clinical agents for treating HIV (elvucitabine, currently in Phase 2 clinical trials) and hot flashes in post-menopausal women and women with breast cancer (Q-122, currently in Phase 2 clinical trials) as well as a CDK7 inhibitor for treating various cancers (CT7001, successfully completed a Phase 1 clinical trial). He is one of the founders of Pharmasset, Inc., which developed the breakthrough anti-hepatitis C drug, Sovaldi (sofosbuvir) and was subsequently acquired by Gilead Sciences.

Liotta obtained his PhD degree at City University of New York and carried out postdoctoral research at Ohio State University, after which he joined the Emory faculty in 1976. He was promoted to full professor in 1988 and currently holds the Samuel Candler Dobbs professorship at Emory. To date, he has supervised over 150 graduate and post-graduate students. In 2011 he was honored with the Thomas Jefferson Award, Emory University's highest service award. He is also the director of the Emory Institute for Drug Development and co-founder of DRIVE (Drug Innovation Ventures at Emory). Earlier he served as the chair of the chemistry department and as Emory's vice president for research. Liotta has published approximately 290 peer-reviewed research publications and holds 89 issued US patents as of December 2018. Currently, he is the founding editor-in-chief of the American Chemical Society journal, ACS Medicinal Chemistry Letters.

Liotta has been the recipient of many distinguished awards, such as the Alfred Burger Award in Medicinal Chemistry, the Wallace H. Carothers Award, the American Chemical Society-Bristol Myers Squibb Smissman Award and the Herty Medal. He is a fellow of the American Association for the Advancement of Science, the American Chemical Society, the National Academy of Inventors and the Australian Academy of Technological Sciences and Engineering.

Liotta has been involved in outreach efforts in Africa for over twenty years and co-founded AHIA (Advancing Health Innovations in Africa), which is aimed at providing the next generation of African scientists with the business and legal skills needed to address their own healthcare issues.
