= Systems and Synthetic Biology =

Scientific journal (2007–2015)

- Discipline: Systems biology, synthetic biology
- Language: English
- Edited by: R. Weiss, P.K. Dhar

Publication details
- History: 2007–2015
- Publisher: Springer Science+Business Media
- Frequency: Quarterly
- Open access: Hybrid

Standard abbreviations
- ISO 4: Syst. Synth. Biol.

Indexing
- ISSN: 1872-5325 (print); 1872-5333 (web)
- OCLC no.: 79931151

Links
- Journal homepage; Online access

Systems and Synthetic Biology is a peer-reviewed scientific journal covering systems and synthetic biology. It was established in 2007 and was published by Springer Science+Business Media. The editors-in-chief were Pawan K. Dhar (University of Kerala) and Ron Weiss (Massachusetts Institute of Technology). The journal's last volume was in 2015.

== Abstracting and indexing ==
The journal is abstracted and indexed in:

- PubMed Central
- Scopus
- Inspec
- Academic OneFile
- AGRICOLA
- EMBiology
- Expanded Academic ASAP
