= Clevudine =

Chemical compound

Clinical data
- Routes of administration: Oral
- ATC code: J05AF12 (WHO)

Identifiers
- IUPAC name: 1-[(2S,3R,4S,5S)-3-fluoro-4-hydroxy-5- (hydroxymethyl)oxolan-2-yl]-5-methylpyrimidine- 2,4-dione
- CAS Number: 163252-36-6; active moiety: 69256-17-3
- PubChem CID: 73115
- ChemSpider: 65894
- UNII: IN51MVP5F1; active moiety: 37F7D05ANB
- KEGG: D03537
- ChEMBL: ChEMBL458875
- CompTox Dashboard (EPA): DTXSID2057659

Chemical and physical data
- Formula: C_{10}H_{13}FN_{2}O_{5}
- Molar mass: 260.221 g·mol^{−1}
- 3D model (JSmol): Interactive image
- SMILES: O=C/1NC(=O)N(\C=C\1C)[C@H]2O[C@H]([C@H](O)[C@H]2F)CO
- InChI: InChI=1S/C10H13FN2O5/c1-4-2-13(10(17)12-8(4)16)9-6(11)7(15)5(3-14)18-9/h2,5-7,9,14-15H,3H2,1H3,(H,12,16,17)/t5-,6+,7-,9-/m0/s1; Key:GBBJCSTXCAQSSJ-XQXXSGGOSA-N

Clevudine (INN) is an antiviral drug for the treatment of hepatitis B (HBV). It is already approved for HBV in South Korea and the Philippines. It is marketed by Bukwang Pharmaceuticals in South Korea under the tradenames Levovir and Revovir.

Researchers in South Korea are testing clevudine at lower doses in combination with adefovir for continued use.

It is a nucleoside analog.
