= Accounts of Materials Research =

- Discipline: materials science, engineering
- Language: English
- Edited by: Jiaxing Huang

Publication details
- History: 2020–present
- Publisher: ShanghaiTech University/American Chemical Society
- Frequency: Monthly
- Open access: Hybrid
- Impact factor: 14.6 (2022)

Standard abbreviations
- ISO 4: Acc. Mater. Res.

Indexing
- CODEN: AMRCDA
- ISSN: 2643-6728
- LCCN: 2019201276
- OCLC no.: 1100761406

Links
- Journal homepage; Online access; Online archive

Accounts of Materials Research (Chinese: 材料研究述評) is a monthly peer-reviewed scientific journal published in partnership between ShanghaiTech University and American Chemical Society. It was rewarded by the Chinese government through Action Plan for the Excellence of Chinese STM Journals in 2020.

The journal is a subscription-access publication that has committed to publishing an increasing number of open access articles, with a future target of transitioning to 100% open access.

== Abstracting and indexing ==
The journal is abstracted and indexed in:

- Chemical Abstracts Service
- Emerging Sources Citation Index
- Scopus

According to the Journal Citation Reports, the journal has a 2022 impact factor of 14.6.
