= Cheng Yung-chi =

- 鄭永齊
- Born: December 29, 1944 (age 81); England
- Education: Tunghai University (BS); Brown University (PhD)
- Known for: Cheng–Prusoff equation Discovery of ganciclovir Discovery of lamivudine Discovery of emtricitabine
- Spouse: Elaine H.C. Cheng
- Children: 2
- Scientific career
- Fields: Biochemical pharmacology
- Workplaces: University of Buffalo; Roswell Park Comprehensive Cancer Center; Academia Sinica; University of North Carolina at Chapel Hill; Yale University
- Thesis: Distribution of Nucleoside Diphosphokinase Isoenenzymes in Animal Tissues (1972)
- Doctoral advisor: R.E. Parks Jr.

Cheng Yung-chi (Chinese: 鄭永齊; pinyin: Zhèng Yǒngqí; born December 29, 1944), also known as Tommy Cheng, is a Taiwanese-American pharmacologist. He is the Henry Bronson Professor of Pharmacology at Yale University, where he is the director of the Cheng laboratory at the Yale School of Medicine devoted to the study of antiviral drugs, and chairman of the Consortium for the Globalization of Chinese Medicine (CGCM).

== Early life and education ==
Cheng was born in England on December 29, 1944, and later moved to Taiwan. After graduating from Tunghai University in 1966 with a Bachelor of Science (B.S.) in chemistry and biology, Cheng went to Canada and studied for a year at the University of Guelph.

Because his wife was a graduate student at Brown University, Cheng decided to transfer to Brown and pursue graduate studies in the United States. He spent his first two years at Brown University studying medicine before earning a Ph.D. in biochemical pharmacology in 1972 from the university, where he had been a research associate under professor R.E. Parks that same year. His doctoral dissertation was titled, "Distribution of Nucleoside Diphosphokinase (NDP Kinase) Isoenenzymes in Animal Tissues."

== Career ==
From September 1972 to June 1973, Cheng was a postdoctoral researcher under pharmacologist William Prusoff at the Yale School of Medicine. In the 1970s, together they co-formulated the Cheng–Prusoff equation to calculate the absolute inhibition constant K_{i} (IC_{50}).

In 1974, Cheng became an assistant professor in pharmacology at the State University of New York (SUNY), during which time he was a scientist in cancer research at the Roswell Park Comprehensive Cancer Center from 1976 to 1977, and was an associate professor of pharmacology at SUNY from 1977 to 1979.

In 1994, Cheng was elected a member of Academia Sinica.

== Personal life ==
Cheng is married to Elaine H.C. Cheng, with whom he has two children.
