= Jan Faul =

American photographer (born 1945)

Jan W. Faul (born 1945, Port Chester, NY) is a photographer who has developed and explored many styles professionally but has specialized in panoramic landscape photography with a focus on battlefields and the environment in Scotland's Highlands and Western Isles.

As a photographer, he has used a great variety of locations and styles throughout his career. His experiences have been varied and his work has taken him from the hills of Appalachia to Europe and beyond.

In 2014–15, he began a shift to impressionist images.

Jan Faul was born to an American mother and a Czech father. By Jan's 18th birthday they had lived in the US and Europe. Upon their arrival in Switzerland, he was given a camera.

In college, Jan first started in engineering and later moved to study art history and printmaking. After a year, he began to combine other disciplines with photography, but by the time he graduated from George Washington University in 1969, he had remained a self-taught photographer.

Upon graduation, Jan worked at the Smithsonian's Arts & Industry Museum, National Portrait Gallery & National Collection of Fine Arts Smithsonian. A year later he left to work for Senator Howard H. Baker Jr. who gave him the boost needed to begin his career in photography. Mr. Faul began as Chief Photographer for the Office of Economic Opportunity. While at OEO he traveled across America portraying the poor and anti-poverty programs. Following his year at OEO, he moved to the Appalachian Regional Commission for two years. Concurrently with the ARC assignments, he was on contract to Time magazine to take assignments in the Washington, D.C., area.

In the mid-1970s he was involved with working Americans as the Smithsonian sent him to portray the occupational folklife of the locksmen on the St. Lawrence Seaway at Massena, NY for the summer. In 1976, he worked for the Working Americans section of the Bicentennial Festival of American Folklife. In 1979, he moved to Denmark and there his work took him throughout Europe. During this period he traveled extensively while doing photography for advertising and various documentary concerns.

He returned to the US after a decade. In March 1993, he began a two-month residency at Yaddo with the express intent of developing new styles.

In 1994-95 Jan was awarded a grant from the Graham Foundation to photograph disappearing family farms in Waukesha County Wisconsin. This project showed the urbanization of this mostly rural county in central Wisconsin and the project it funded meant that after 1995, he took fewer commercial assignments.

Thereafter he worked mostly on landscapes of California and the West. By 1996, his landscapes had become specifically panoramic.

In 1996, he began working on American Civil War battlefields stretching from Pennsylvania to New Mexico and continued to work with these locations for 20 years. In addition he was working on series' on Lake Vättern (Sweden), Ghost of the Atom Nevada Test Site neighboring AMARG and WSMR , as well as RAF Bomber Command and USAAF World War II airfields in East Anglia, the Midlands, and Scotland. Abstractions of these images are available as prints.

In 2014, he launched the website worldwar2memories.com for the purpose of bringing our multitude of memories about WW2 to become wall art, including the Air War in Europe, the Ground War in Europe, the, and. "Born" includes Americans like Bill Bradley, Fred Dalton Thompson, Elizabeth Ashley, and Muhammad Ali.

In 2015, Mr. Faul began working with abstractions of his earlier images, and by mid-2016 had developed an impressionist color style which becomes more developed with each passing month. When asked how they are made, and Mr. Faul says, "First you buy a copy of Photoshop, then add 500,000+ images on film, and stir. Bake until golden brown."

== Photography and design awards ==
- 1992, 91, 90, 79, 78, 77, 76, 75 - Art Directors Club of Metro Washington Annual Show
- 1978 - Corcoran Gallery of Art Regional Photography Show
- 1977 - American Institute of Architects
- 1977 - 28th Annual Show, Silver Medals, Art Directors Club
- 1976 - 27th Annual Show, Gold Medal, Art Directors Club
- 1974 - Pictures of the Year - Univ. of Missouri & NPPA

== One-man exhibitions ==
- 2015 - Art Net http://www.artnet.com/artists/jan-w-faul/
- 2003 - Richmond National Battlefield Park Civil War Visitor Center Tredegar Iron Works
- 2002 - Sol Mednick Gallery, University of the Arts, Philadelphia
- 2001 - The Washington Post, washingtonpost.com
- 2001 - Masters of Photography, Washington DC
- 1996 - Col. Brooks Gallery, Washington, DC
- 1996 - Wohlfarth Galleries, Washington, DC
- 1996 - Kentlands Gallery, Gaithersburg, MD
- 1993 - Kristin Johnson Gallery, Washington DC
- 1992 - Arnold & Porter, Washington, DC
- 1991 - Wohlfarth Galleries, Washington, DC
- 1984 - Gallery Blomsten, Copenhagen
- 1976 - Montgomery Museum of Fine Arts
- 1974 - Photo Impressions Gallery, Washington DC

== Selected group exhibitions ==
- 2016 - Photo Review, Competition, Philadelphia
- 2008 - "Paradoxes of Modernism" Kuhn Library Gallery, UMBC Baltimore, MD
- 2006 - National Museum of American History, Washington, DC
- 2000 - Princeton Historical Society
- 1996 - Good Nudes, Museum of Contemporary Art, Washington DC
- 1996 - Black and white and colored, W Photography, Provincetown
- 1996 - Yosemite Renaissance XI, Yosemite Museum
- 1996 - ARTSITES96, DC Arts Center, Washington DC
- 1995 - Post-Pop, Museum of Contemporary Art, Washington, DC
- 1995 - Photropolis '95, San Diego Art Institute
- 1994 - Darkside, 8th Street Gallery, Albuquerque
- 1994 - New Face of the Portrait, Fuller Mus. of Art, Brockton, MA
- 1994 - Classic Visions, Catskill Mountain Gallery, Catskill, NY
- 1994 - In the Tradition, Maude Kerns Art Center, Eugene OR
- 1994 - Photographic Selections, Nabisco Gallery
- 1994 - Works on Paper, 26th Univ. of Delaware Biennial
- 1992 - Washington Center for Photography, Wash. DC
- 1992 - Washington Project for the Arts, Wash., DC
- 1992 - Wohlfarth Galleries, Provincetown, MA
- 1992 - Wohlfarth Galleries, Wash., DC
- 1989 - Herbert F. Johnson Museum, Cornell University, NY
- 1988 - photokina, Cologne, Germany
- 1988 - IMP/George Eastman House, Rochester, NY
- 1978 - The Washington Post, Washington, DC
- 1977 - Corcoran Gallery of Art Regional Photography, Wash., DC
- 1974 - Pictures of the Year, University of Missouri
- 1972 - Environments '72, The Corcoran Gallery of Art, Wash. DC
- 1970 - Amerika!, Moscow, USIA plus 51 others

== Books ==
- A Day with the Greatest, photographs of Ali made in 1973, plus a narrative text by Jan W Faul, Kommode Verlag, Zürich, 2016
- Fields of Honor, National Geographic, 2006
