= Emtricitabine =

Antiretroviral drug used to treat HIV infection

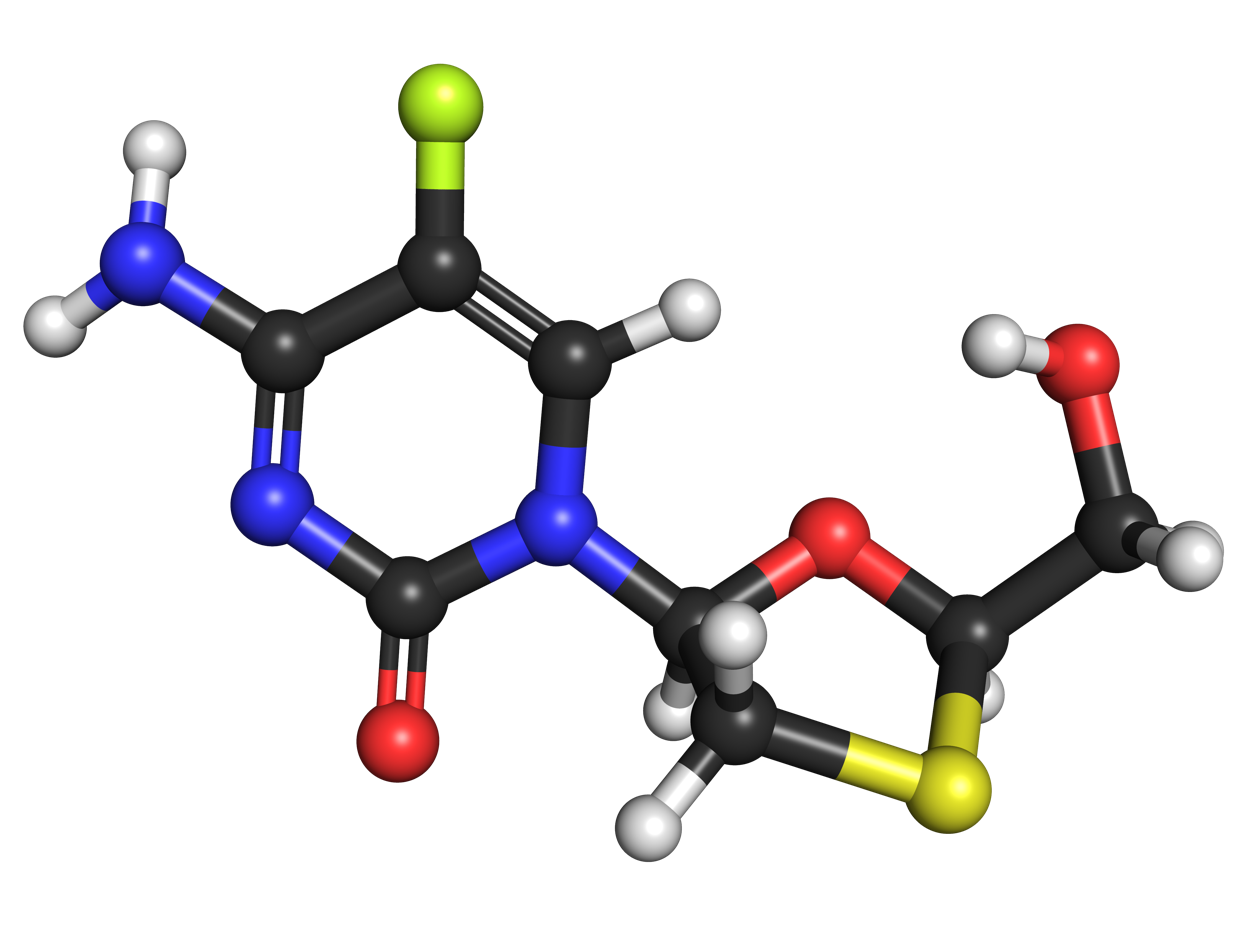
- Above: molecular structure of emtricitabine Below: 3D representation of an emtricitabine molecule

Clinical data
- Pronunciation: /ˌɛmtrəˈsaɪtəˌbiːn/ EM-trə-SYE-tə-been
- Trade names: Emtriva
- Other names: FTC
- AHFS/Drugs.com: Monograph
- MedlinePlus: a604004
- License data: EU EMA: by INN; US DailyMed: Emtricitabine
- Pregnancy category: AU: B1
- Routes of administration: By mouth
- ATC code: J05AF09 (WHO)

Legal status
- Legal status: UK: POM (Prescription only); US: ℞-only; EU: Rx-only

Pharmacokinetic data
- Bioavailability: 93%
- Protein binding: Very low (less than 4%)
- Metabolism: Hepatic oxidation and glucuronidation CYP system not involved
- Elimination half-life: 10 hours
- Excretion: Renal (86%) and fecal (14%)

Identifiers
- IUPAC name: 4-Amino-5-fluoro-1-[(2R,5S)-2-(hydroxymethyl)-1,3-oxathiolan-5-yl]pyrimidin-2-one
- CAS Number: 143491-57-0
- PubChem CID: 60877
- DrugBank: DB00879
- ChemSpider: 54859
- UNII: G70B4ETF4S
- KEGG: D01199
- ChEBI: CHEBI:31536
- ChEMBL: ChEMBL885
- NIAID ChemDB: 004782
- CompTox Dashboard (EPA): DTXSID0040129
- ECHA InfoCard: 100.120.945

Chemical and physical data
- Formula: C_{8}H_{10}FN_{3}O_{3}S
- Molar mass: 247.24 g·mol^{−1}
- 3D model (JSmol): Interactive image
- SMILES: FC=1\C(=N/C(=O)N(C=1)[C@H]2O[C@H](SC2)CO)\N
- InChI: InChI=1S/C8H10FN3O3S/c9-4-1-12(8(14)11-7(4)10)5-3-16-6(2-13)15-5/h1,5-6,13H,2-3H2,(H2,10,11,14)/t5-,6+/m0/s1; Key:XQSPYNMVSIKCOC-NTSWFWBYSA-N

Emtricitabine (commonly called FTC, systematic name (−)-2',3'-dideoxy-5-fluoro-3'-thiacytidine), with trade name Emtriva (formerly Coviracil), is a nucleoside reverse-transcriptase inhibitor (NRTI) for the prevention and treatment of HIV infection in adults and children. In 2019, it was the 494th most commonly prescribed medication in the United States, with more than 3 thousand prescriptions. It is an analog of the nucleoside cytidine.

Emtricitabine makes up one fourth of the Quad pill (brand names: Stribild and Genvoya). It is also marketed in a fixed-dose combination with tenofovir disoproxil (Viread) under the brand name Truvada, and with tenofovir alafenamide (Vemlidy) under the brand name Descovy. In fixed-dose combinations with tenofovir or with efavirenz and tenofovir it is on the World Health Organization's List of Essential Medicines. A fixed-dose triple combination of emtricitabine, tenofovir, and efavirenz (Sustiva, marketed by Bristol-Myers Squibb) was approved by the U.S. Food and Drug Administration (FDA) on July 12, 2006, under the brand name Atripla.

== Medical uses ==
=== HIV infection ===
Emtricitabine is indicated in combination with other antiretroviral agents for the prevention and treatment of HIV-1 infection.

=== HBV infection ===
Emtricitabine exhibits clinical activity against the hepatitis B virus (HBV), but is not approved by the U.S. Food and Drug Administration (FDA) for the treatment of HBV infection. Among individuals with chronic HBV infection, emtricitabine treatment results in significant histologic, virologic, and biochemical improvement. The safety profile of emtricitabine during treatment is similar to that of a placebo. Emtricitabine, like all other FDA approved drugs, cures neither HIV nor HBV infection. In a study involving individuals with HBV infection, symptoms of infection returned in 23% of emtricitabine-treated individuals who were taken off therapy. In studies involving individuals with chronic HIV infection, viral replication also resumes when study subjects are taken off therapy. As with drugs used to treat HIV infection, drugs used to treat HBV infection may have to be used in combination to prevent the evolution of drug resistant strains. The effectiveness of emtricitabine in combination with other anti-HBV drugs has not been established.

== Side effects ==
In clinical practice, toxicity with emtricitabine is unusual. The most common treatment-related adverse events are diarrhea, headache, nausea, and rash. These symptoms are generally mild to moderate in severity, but they caused 1% of clinical trial patients to give up treatment. Skin discoloration, which is typically reported as hyperpigmentation and usually affects either the palms of the hands or the soles of the feet, is reported in less than 2% of individuals and is almost exclusive to patients of African origin.

Among the more severe side effects patients may experience are a hepatotoxicity or a lactic acidosis.

== Mechanism of action ==
Emtricitabine is an analogue of cytidine. The drug works by inhibiting reverse transcriptase, the enzyme that copies HIV RNA into new viral DNA. By interfering with this process, which is central to the replication of HIV, emtricitabine can help to lower the amount of HIV, or "viral load", in a patient's body and can indirectly increase the number of immune system cells (namely T cells/CD4+ T-cells). Both of these changes are associated with healthier immune systems and decreased likelihood of serious illness.

== History ==
Emtricitabine was discovered by Dennis C. Liotta, Raymond F. Schinazi, and Woo-Baeg Choi of Emory University and licensed to Triangle Pharmaceuticals by Emory in 1996 in a collaboration with Dr. Yung-Chi Cheng at Yale University. Triangle Pharmaceuticals was acquired in 2003 by Gilead Sciences, which completed development and now markets the product with the brand name Emtriva.

It was approved by the FDA July 2, 2003. It is very similar to lamivudine (3TC) and cross-resistance between the two is near-universal.
