= American Chemical Society =

American scientific society

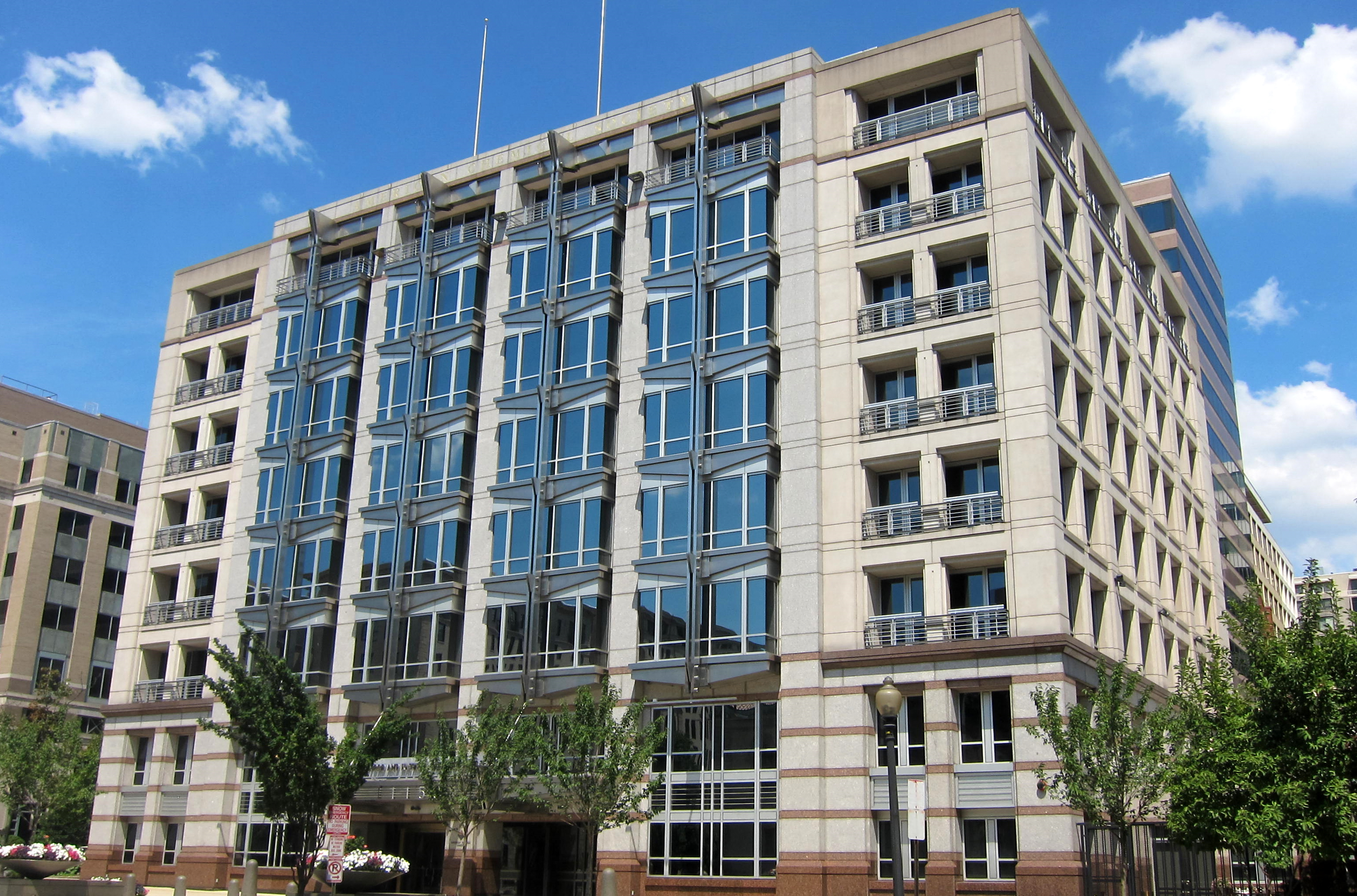
- American Chemical Society Building in downtown Washington, D.C.
- Formation: April 6, 1876; 150 years ago
- Type: Scientific society
- Legal status: 501(c)(3) nonprofit organization
- Headquarters: Washington, D.C.
- Location: United States
- Members: More than 262,000
- President: Rigoberto Hernandez
- Key people: Albert G. Horvath (CEO)
- Budget: US$834 million (2025)
- Website: www.acs.org

The American Chemical Society (ACS) is a scientific society based in the United States that supports scientific inquiry in the field of chemistry. Founded in 1876 at New York University, the ACS currently has more than 262,000 members at all degree levels and in all fields of chemistry, chemical engineering, and related fields. It is one of the world's largest scientific societies by membership. The ACS is a 501(c)(3) non-profit organization and holds a congressional charter under Title 36 of the United States Code. Its headquarters are located in Washington, D.C., and it has a large concentration of staff in Columbus, Ohio.

The ACS is a source of scientific information through its peer-reviewed scientific journals, national conferences, and the Chemical Abstracts Service. Its publications division produces over 90 scholarly journals including the prestigious Journal of the American Chemical Society, as well as the monthly trade magazine Chemical & Engineering News. The ACS holds national meetings twice a year covering the complete field of chemistry and also holds smaller conferences concentrating on specific chemical fields or geographic regions. The primary source of income of the ACS is the Chemical Abstracts Service, a provider of chemical databases worldwide.

The ACS has student chapters in virtually every major university in the United States and outside the United States as well. These student chapters mainly focus on volunteering opportunities, career development, and the discussion of student and faculty research. The organization also publishes textbooks, administers several national chemistry awards, provides grants for scientific research, and supports various educational and outreach activities.

The ACS has been criticized for predatory pricing of its products (SciFinder, journals and other publications), for opposing open access publishing, as well as for initiating numerous copyright enforcement litigations despite its non-profit status and its chartered commitment to dissemination of chemical information.

== History ==
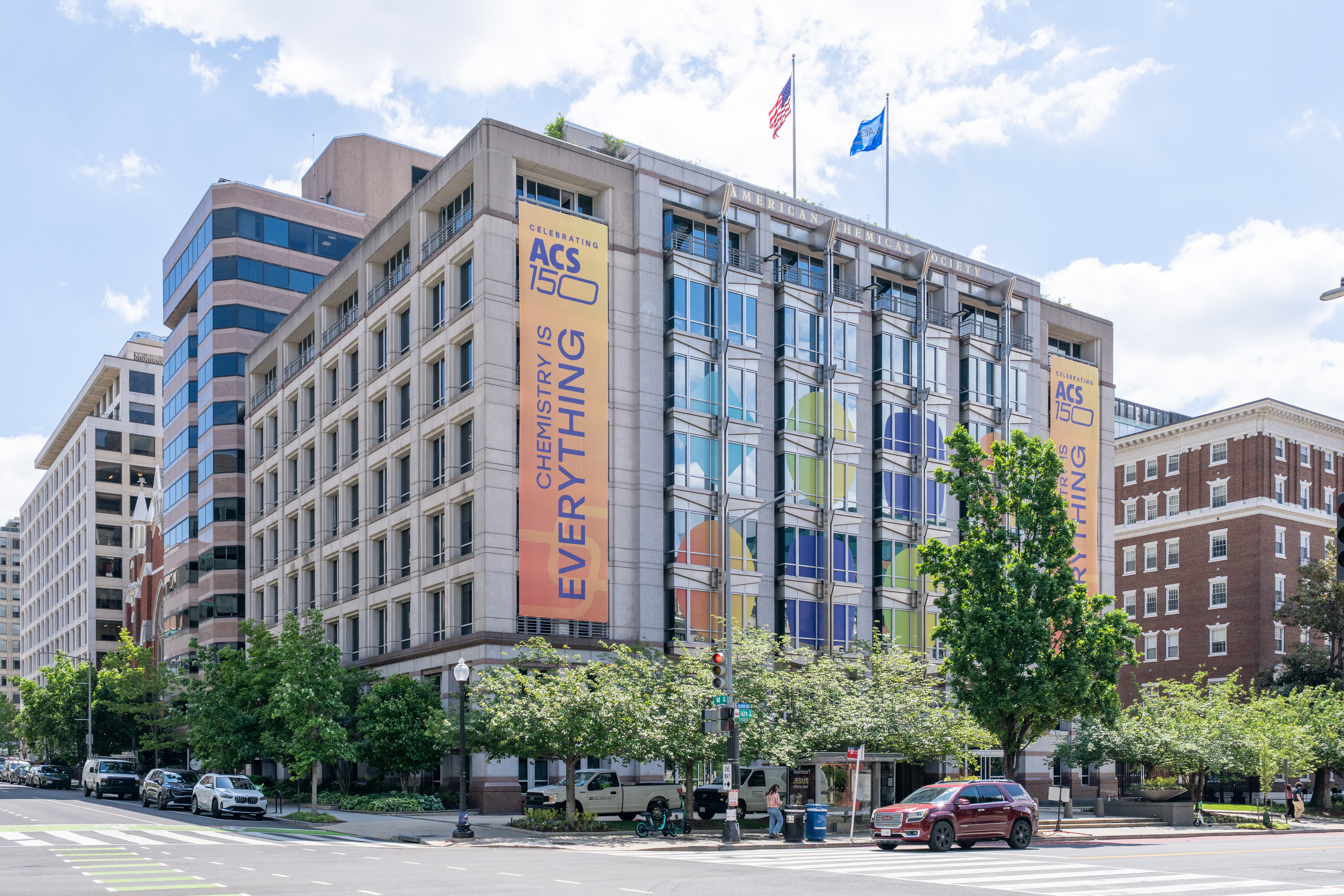
American Chemical Society headquarters in Washington, D.C.

=== Creation ===
In 1874, a group of American chemists gathered at the Joseph Priestley House to mark the 100th anniversary of Priestley's discovery of oxygen. Although there was an American scientific society at that time (the American Association for the Advancement of Science, founded in 1848), the growth of chemistry in the U.S. prompted those assembled to consider founding a new society that would focus more directly on theoretical and applied chemistry. Two years later, on April 6, 1876, during a meeting of chemists at the University of the City of New York (now New York University) the American Chemical Society was founded. The society received its charter of incorporation from the State of New York in 1877.

Charles F. Chandler, a professor of chemistry at Columbia University who was instrumental in organizing the society said that such a body would "prove a powerful and healthy stimulus to original research, ... would awaken and develop much talent now wasting in isolation, ... [bring] members of the association into closer union, and ensure a better appreciation of our science and its students on the part of the general public."

Although Chandler was a likely choice to become the society's first president because of his role in organizing the society, New York University chemistry professor John William Draper was elected as the first president of the society because of his national reputation. Draper was a photochemist and pioneering photographer who had produced one of the first photographic portraits in 1840. Chandler would later serve as president in 1881 and 1889.

Former logo (1909–2026)

In the former ACS logo, originally designed in the early 20th century by Tiffany's Jewelers and used since 1909, a stylized symbol of a kaliapparat is used.

=== Growth ===
The Journal of the American Chemical Society was founded in 1879 to publish original chemical research. It was the first journal published by ACS and is still the society's flagship peer-reviewed publication. In 1907, Chemical Abstracts was established as a separate journal (it previously appeared within JACS), which later became the Chemical Abstracts Service, a division of ACS that provides chemical information to researchers and others worldwide. Chemical & Engineering News is a monthly trade magazine that has been published by ACS since 1923.

The society adopted a new constitution aimed at nationalizing the organization in 1890. In 1905, the American Chemical Society moved from New York City to Washington, D.C. ACS was reincorporated under a congressional charter in 1937. It was granted by the U.S. Congress and signed by president Franklin D. Roosevelt. ACS's headquarters moved to its current location in downtown Washington in 1941.

== Organization ==
=== Divisions ===
ACS first established technical divisions in 1908 to foster the exchange of information among scientists who work in particular fields of chemistry or professional interests. Divisional activities include organizing technical sessions at ACS meetings, publishing books and resources, administering awards and lectureships, and conducting other events. The original five divisions were 1) organic chemistry, 2) industrial chemists and chemical engineers, 3) agricultural and food chemistry, 4) fertilizer chemistry, and 5) physical and inorganic chemistry.

As of 2016, there are 32 technical divisions of ACS.

- Agricultural and food chemistry
- Agrochemicals
- Analytical chemistry
- Biochemical technology
- Biological chemistry
- Business development & management
- Carbohydrate chemistry
- Catalysis science & technology
- Cellulose and renewable materials
- Chemical education
- Chemical health & safety
- Chemical information
- Chemical toxicology
- Chemistry & the law
- Colloid & surface chemistry
- Computers in chemistry
- Energy & fuels
- Environmental chemistry
- Fluorine chemistry
- Geochemistry
- History of chemistry
- Industrial & engineering chemistry
- Inorganic chemistry
- Medicinal chemistry
- Nuclear chemistry and Technology
- Organic chemistry
- Physical chemistry
- Polymer chemistry
- Polymeric materials: science and engineering
- Professional relations
- Rubber
- Small chemical businesses

==== Division of Organic Chemistry ====
This is the largest division of the Society. It marked its 100th anniversary in 2008. The first Chair of the Division was Edward Curtis Franklin. The Organic Division played a part in establishing Organic Syntheses, Inc. and Organic Reactions, Inc. and it maintains close ties to both organizations.

The Division's best known activities include organizing symposia (talks and poster sessions) at the biannual ACS National Meetings, for the purpose of recognizing promising Assistant Professors, talented young researchers, outstanding technical contributions from junior-level chemists, in the field of organic chemistry. The symposia also honor national award winners, including the Arthur C. Cope Award, Cope Scholar Award, James Flack Norris Award in Physical Organic Chemistry, Herbert C. Brown Award for Creative Research in Synthetic Methods.

The Division helps to organize symposia at the international meeting called Pacifichem and it organizes the biennial National Organic Chemistry Symposium (NOS) which highlights recent advances in organic chemistry and hosts the Roger Adams Award address. The Division also organizes corporate sponsorships to provide fellowships for PhD students and undergraduates. It also organizes the Graduate Research Symposium and manages award and travel grant programs for undergraduates.

=== Local sections ===
Local sections were authorized in 1890 and are autonomous units of the American Chemical Society. They elect their own officers and select representatives to the national ACS organization. Local sections also provide professional development opportunities for members, organize community outreach events, offer awards, and conduct other business. The Rhode Island Section was the first local section of ACS, organized in 1891. There are currently 186 local sections of the American Chemical Society in all 50 states, the District of Columbia, and Puerto Rico.

=== International Chemical Sciences Chapters ===
International Chemical Sciences Chapters allow ACS members outside of the U.S. to organize locally for professional and scientific exchange. There are currently 36 International Chemical Sciences Chapters.

- Australia
- Bangladesh
- Brazil
- China National Capital Area (JingJinJi)
- Colombia
- East and Northeast India
- Ecuador
- Egypt
- Georgia
- Ghana
- Guangdong
- Guatemala
- Hong Kong
- Hungary
- Iraq
- Israel
- Jordan
- Malaysia
- Nigeria
- Northeast China
- Pakistan
- Peru
- Qatar
- Republic of China (Taiwan)
- Romania
- Saudi Arabia
- Shanghai
- Singapore
- South Africa
- South Korea
- South Western China
- Sri Lanka
- Switzerland
- Thailand
- United Arab Emirates
- West India

== Educational activities and programs ==
=== Chemical education and outreach ===
ACS states that it offers teacher training to support the professional development of science teachers so they can better present chemistry in the classroom, foster the scientific curiosity of our nation's youth and encourage future generations to pursue scientific careers. As of 2009, Clifford and Kathryn Hach donated $33 million to ACS, to continue the work of the Hach Scientific Foundation in supporting high school chemistry teaching.

The Society sponsors the United States National Chemistry Olympiad (USNCO), a contest used to select the four-member team that represents the United States at the International Chemistry Olympiad (IChO).

The ACS Division of Chemical Education provides standardized tests for various subfields of chemistry. The two most commonly used tests are the undergraduate-level tests for general and organic chemistry. Each of these tests consists of 70 multiple-choice questions, and gives students 110 minutes to complete the exam.

The ACS also approves certified undergraduate programs in chemistry. A student who completes the required laboratory and course work—sometimes in excess of what a particular college may require for its Bachelor's degree—is considered by the Society to be well trained for professional work.

The ACS coordinates two annual public awareness campaigns, National Chemistry Week and Chemists Celebrate Earth Week, as part of its educational outreach. Since 1978 and 2003 respectively, the campaigns have been celebrated with a yearly theme, such as "Chemistry Colors Our World" (2015) and "Energy: Now and Forever!" (2013).

=== Green Chemistry Institute ===
The Green Chemistry Institute (GCI) supports the "implementation of green chemistry and engineering throughout the global chemistry enterprise." The GCI organizes an annual conference, the Green Chemistry and Engineering Conference, provides research grants, administers awards, and provides information and support for green chemistry practices to educators, researchers, and industry.

The GCI was founded in 1997 as an independent non-profit organization, by chemists Joe Breen and Dennis Hjeresen in cooperation with the Environmental Protection Agency. In 2001, the GCI became a part of the American Chemical Society.

=== Petroleum Research Fund ===
The Petroleum Research Fund (PRF) is an endowment fund administered by the ACS that supports advanced education and fundamental research in the petroleum and fossil fuel fields at non-profit institutions. Several categories of grants are offered for various career levels and institutions. The fund awarded more than $25 million in grants in 2007.

The PRF traces its origins to the acquisition of the Universal Oil Products laboratory by a consortium of oil companies in 1931. The companies established a trust fund, The Petroleum Research Fund, in 1944 to prevent antitrust litigation tied to their UOP assets. The ACS was named the beneficiary of the trust. The first grants from the PRF were awarded in 1954. In 2000, the trust was transferred to the ACS. The ACS established The American Chemical Society Petroleum Research Fund and the previous trust was dissolved. The PRF trust was valued at $144.7 million in December 2014.

=== Other programs ===
The ACS International Activities is the birthplace of the ACS International Center, an online resource for scientists and engineers looking to study abroad or explore an international career or internship. The site houses information on hundreds of scholarships and grants related to all levels of experience to promote scientific mobility of researchers and practitioners in STEM fields.

The Society grants membership to undergraduates as student members provided they can pay the $25 yearly dues. Any university may start its own ACS Student Chapter and receive benefits of undergraduate participation in regional conferences and discounts on ACS publications.

== Awards ==
=== National awards ===
The American Chemical Society administers 64 national awards, medals and prizes based on scientific contributions at various career levels that promote achievement across the chemical sciences. The ACS national awards program began in 1922 with the establishment of the Priestley Medal, the highest award offered by the ACS, which is given for distinguished services to chemistry.

=== Other awards ===
Additional awards are offered by divisions, local sections and other bodies of ACS. The William H. Nichols Medal Award was the first ACS award to honor outstanding researchers in the field of chemistry. It was established in 1903 by the ACS New York Section and is named for William H. Nichols, an American chemist and businessman and one of the original founders of ACS. Of the over 100 Nichols Medalists, 16 have subsequently been awarded the Nobel Prize in Chemistry. The Willard Gibbs Award, granted by the ACS Chicago Section, was established in 1910 in honor of Josiah Willard Gibbs, the Yale University professor who formulated the phase rule.

The Georgia Local Section of ACS has awarded the Herty Medal since 1933 recognizing outstanding chemists who have significantly contributed to their chosen fields. All chemists in academic, government, or industrial laboratories who have been residing in the southeastern United States for at least 10 years are eligible.

The New York Section of ACS also gives Leadership Awards. The Leadership Awards are the highest honors given by the Chemical Marketing and Economic Group of ACS NY since December 6, 2012. They are presented to leaders of industry, investments, and other sectors, for their contributions to science, technology, engineering and mathematics (STEM) initiatives. Honorees include Andrew N. Liveris (Dow Chemical), P. Roy Vagelos (Regeneron, Merck), Thomas M. Connelly (DuPont) and Juan Pablo del Valle (Mexichem).

The ACS also administers regional awards presented annually at regional meetings. This includes the E. Ann Nalley Regional Award for Volunteer Service to the American Chemical Society, Regional Awards for Excellence in High School Teaching, and the Stanley C. Israel Regional Award for Advancing Diversity in the Chemical Sciences.

== Journals and magazines ==
ACS Publications is the publishing division of the ACS. It is a nonprofit academic publisher of scientific journals covering various fields of chemistry and related sciences. As of 2026, ACS Publications published the following peer-reviewed journals:

- Accounts of Chemical Research
- Accounts of Materials Research
- ACS Agricultural Science & Technology
- ACS Applied Bio Materials
- ACS Applied Catalysis
- ACS Applied Electronic Materials
- ACS Applied Energy Materials
- ACS Applied Engineering Materials
- ACS Applied Materials & Interfaces
- ACS Applied Nano Materials
- ACS Applied Optical Materials
- ACS Applied Polymer Materials
- ACS Bio & Med Chem Au
- ACS Biomaterials Science & Engineering
- ACS Catalysis
- ACS Central Science
- ACS Chemical Biology
- ACS Chemical Health & Safety
- ACS Chemical Neuroscience
- ACS Combinatorial Science (Note: Formerly the Journal of Combinatorial Chemistry.)
- ACS Earth and Space Chemistry
- ACS Electrochemistry
- ACS Energy Letters
- ACS Engineering Au
- ACS Environmental Au
- ACS ES&T Air
- ACS ES&T Toxicology
- ACS ES&T Engineering
- ACS ES&T Water
- ACS Food Science & Technology
- ACS Infectious Diseases
- ACS Macro Letters
- ACS Materials Au
- ACS Materials Letters
- ACS Measurement Science Au
- ACS Medicinal Chemistry Letters
- ACS Nano
- ACS Nano Medicine
- ACS Nanoscience Au
- ACS Nutrition Science
- ACS Omega
- ACS Organic & Inorganic Au
- ACS Pharmacology & Translational Science
- ACS Photonics
- ACS Physical Chem Au
- ACS Polymers Au
- ACS Sensors
- ACS Sustainable Chemistry & Engineering
- ACS Sustainable Resource Management
- ACS Synthetic Biology
- Analytical Chemistry
- Artificial Photosynthesis
- Biochemistry
- Bioconjugate Chemistry
- Biomacromolecules
- Biotechnology Progress (Note: Co-published with the American Institute of Chemical Engineers (AIChE).)
- Chem & Bio Engineering
- Chemical & Biomedical Imaging
- Chemical Research in Toxicology
- Chemical Reviews
- Chemistry of Materials
- Crystal Growth & Design
- Digital Medical Engineering
- Energy & Fuels
- Environment & Health
- Environmental Health Perspectives (Note: Published until 2025 by the National Institute of Environmental Health Sciences.)
- Environmental Science & Technology
- Environmental Science & Technology Letters
- I&EC Product Research and Development
- Industrial & Engineering Chemistry
- Industrial & Engineering Chemistry Analytical Edition
- Industrial & Engineering Chemistry Fundamentals
- Industrial & Engineering Chemistry Process Design and Development
- Industrial & Engineering Chemistry Product Research and Development
- Industrial & Engineering Chemistry Research
- Industrial & Engineering Chemistry, News Edition
- Inorganic Chemistry
- JACS Au
- Journal of Agricultural and Food Chemistry
- Journal of Chemical & Engineering Data
- Journal of Chemical Education
- Journal of Chemical Information and Modeling
- Journal of Chemical Theory and Computation
- Journal of Combinatorial Chemistry
- Journal of Industrial & Engineering Chemistry
- Journal of Medicinal Chemistry
- Journal of Natural Products (Note: Co-published with the American Society of Pharmacognosy.)
- The Journal of Organic Chemistry
- The Journal of Physical Chemistry
- The Journal of Physical Chemistry A
- The Journal of Physical Chemistry B
- The Journal of Physical Chemistry C
- The Journal of Physical Chemistry Letters
- Journal of Proteome Research
- Journal of the American Chemical Society
- Journal of the American Society for Mass Spectrometry
- Langmuir
- Macromolecules
- Molecular Pharmaceutics
- Nano Letters
- News Edition, American Chemical Society
- Organic Letters
- Organic Process Research & Development
- Organometallics
- Photon Science
- Polymer Science & Technology
- Precision Chemistry
- Product R&D

Additionally, several technical divisions of the ACS publish their own peer-reviewed journals, separate from ACS Publications:

- Computers in Chemistry Division: Journal of Molecular Graphics and Modelling (Note: in collaboration with the Molecular Graphics and Modelling Society, published with Elsevier.) and Annual Reports in Computational Chemistry
- History Division: Bulletin for the History of Chemistry (Note: in collaboration with the University of Illinois.)
- Medicinal Chemistry Division: Medicinal Chemistry Reviews
- Rubber Division: Rubber Chemistry and Technology

In addition to academic journals, ACS Publications also publishes Chemical & Engineering News, a weekly trade magazine covering news in the chemical profession, inChemistry, a magazine for undergraduate students, and ChemMatters, a magazine for high school students and teachers.

ACS also created ChemRxiv, which is an open access preprint repository for the chemical sciences, co-owned, and collaboratively managed by the ACS, the German Chemical Society (GDCh), the Royal Society of Chemistry (RSC), the chemistry community, other societies, funders, and non-profits; open for submissions and available for all readers at ChemRxiv.

== Controversies ==
=== Open access ===
In debates about free access to scientific information, the ACS has been described as "in an interesting dilemma, with some of its representatives pushing for open access and others hating the very thought." The ACS has generally opposed legislation that would mandate free access to scientific journal articles and chemical information. However it has recently launched new open access journals and provided authors with open access publishing options. Nevertheless, the actual percentage of open-access publications in ACS journals is the lowest among the 8 major scientific journal publishers (see figure below):

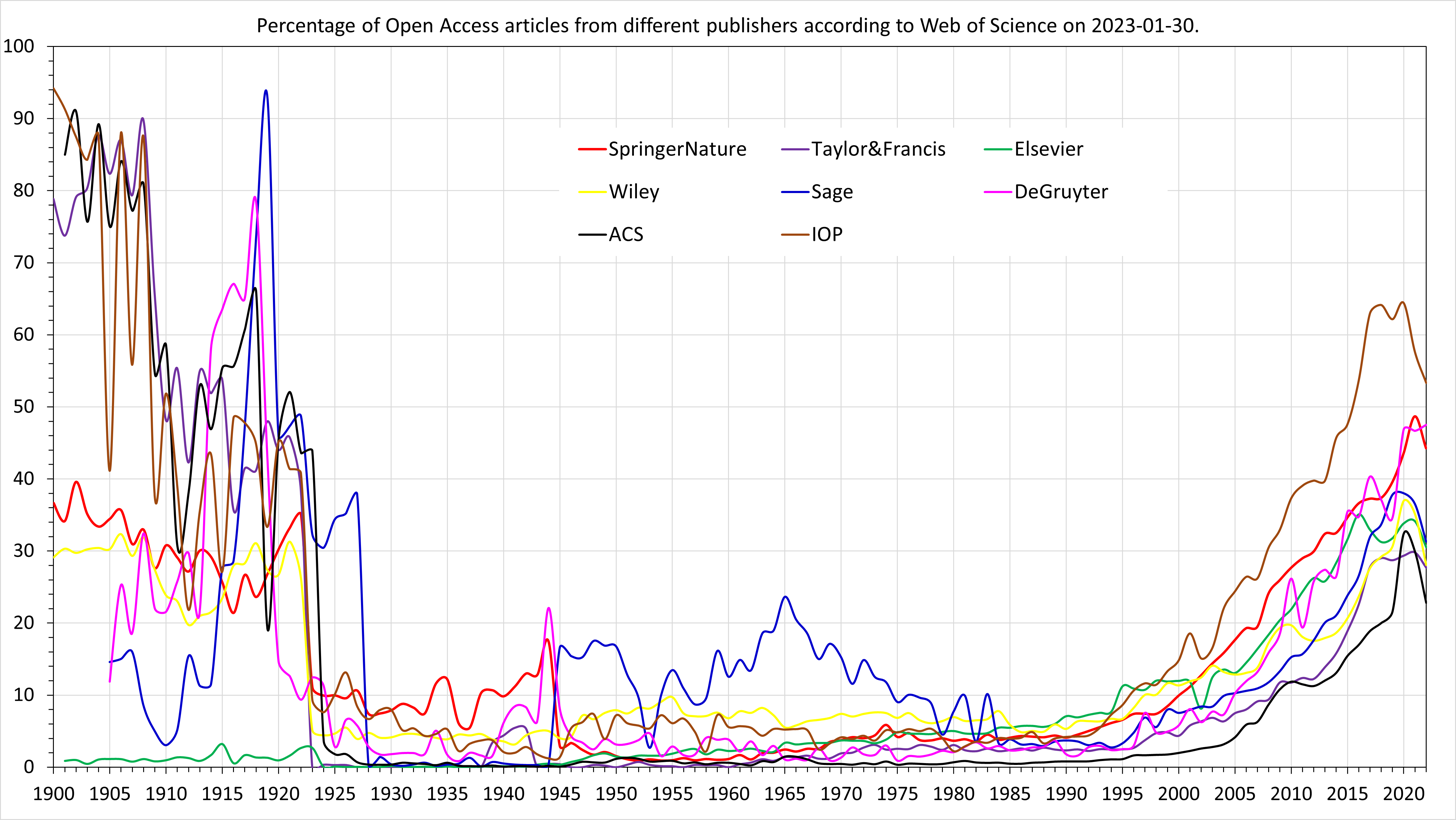
Open access by year according to Web of Science

==== Journals ====
The mid-2000s saw a debate between some research funders (including the federal government), which argued that research they funded should be presented freely to the public, and some publishers (including the ACS), which argued that the costs of peer-review and publishing justified their subscription prices. In 2006, Congress debated legislation that would have instructed the National Institutes of Health (NIH) to require all investigators it funded to submit copies of final, peer-reviewed journal articles to PubMed Central, a free-access digital repository it operates, within 12 months of publication. At the time the American Association of Publishers (of which ACS is a member) hired a public relations firm to counter the open access movement. In spite of publishers' opposition, the PubMed Central legislation was passed in December 2007 and became effective in 2008.

As the open access issue has continued to evolve, so too has the ACS's position. In response to a 2013 White House Office of Science and Technology Policy directive that instructed federal agencies to provide greater access to federally funded research, the ACS joined other scholarly publishers in establishing the Clearinghouse for the Open Research of the United States (Chorus) to allow free access to published articles. The ACS has also introduced several open access publishing options for its journals, including providing authors the option to pay an upfront fee to enable free online access to their articles. In 2015, the ACS launched the first fully open access journal in the society's history, ACS Central Science. The ACS states that the journal offers the same peer-review standards as its subscription journals, but without publishing charges to either authors or readers. A second open access title, ACS Omega, an interdisciplinary mega journal, launched in 2016. In December 2020, the ACS launched a series of 9 gold open access journals under the name ACS Au (chemical symbol for gold) which include ACS Bio & Med Chem Au, ACS Engineering Au, ACS Environmental Au, ACS Materials Au, ACS Measurement Science Au, ACS Nanoscience Au, ACS Organic & Inorganic Au, ACS Physical Chem Au and ACS Polymers Au.

==== Databases ====
In 2005, the ACS was criticized for opposing the creation of PubChem, which is an open access chemical database developed by the NIH's National Center for Biotechnology Information. The ACS raised concerns that the publicly supported PubChem database would duplicate and unfairly compete with their existing fee-based Chemical Abstracts Service and argued that the database should only present data created by the Molecular Libraries Screening Center initiative of the NIH.

The ACS lobbied members of the United States Congress to rein in PubChem and hired outside lobbying firms to try to persuade congressional members, the NIH, and the Office of Management and Budget (OMB) against establishing a publicly funded database. The ACS was unsuccessful, and as of 2012 PubChem is the world's largest free chemical database.

The ACS is also the only provider of a major scientific publication database (SciFinder) that imposes a restriction on the number of records that can be exported. None of the competing products, such as Web of Science (owned by Clarivate), Scopus (owned by Elsevier) and The Lens (owned by Cambia) have similar restrictions.

=== Litigations ===
The ACS has been involved in numerous lawsuits regarding access to its databases, trademark rights, and copyrighted material. In many of these cases, the ACS lost or ended up with an unenforceable judgement. These include:

- Dialog v. American Chemical Society, a suit claiming antitrust violations in access to ACS databases, settled out of court in 1993;
- American Chemical Society v. Google, a suit claiming trademark violation, settled out of court in 2006;
- American Chemical Society v. Leadscope, a suit alleging stolen trade secrets, concluded in 2012 with ACS losing its trade secrets claim and Leadscope losing its counterclaim of defamation;
- A suit against ResearchGate, where a German court refused to award monetary compensation to the ACS and Elsevier;
- A suit against Sci-Hub, which resulted in a non-enforceable judgement.

The ACS was also found guilty in several lawsuits brought against the Society by its employees.

=== Executive compensation ===
In 2004, a group of ACS members criticized the compensation of former executive director and chief executive officer John Crum, whose total salary, expenses, and bonuses for 2002 was reported to be $767,834. The ACS defended the figure, saying that it was in line with that of comparable organizations, including for-profit publishers.

As of 2016, two employees were reported to have a total compensation exceeding $900,000, while 694 had a compensation exceeding $100,000.

== See also ==
- Reagent Chemicals (Reagent ACS), standards of chemical purity
- ACS style, the ACS's citation standard
- Association for Learned and Professional Society Publishers
- Chemical Abstracts Service
- List of learned societies
- List of international professional associations
- National Chemistry Week
- National Historic Chemical Landmarks
