= Bratčice =

Bratčice may refer to places in the Czech Republic:

- Bratčice (Brno-Country District), a municipality and village in the South Moravian Region
- Bratčice (Kutná Hora District), a municipality and village in the Central Bohemian Region
