= Josef Michl =

Czech-American chemist (1939–2024)

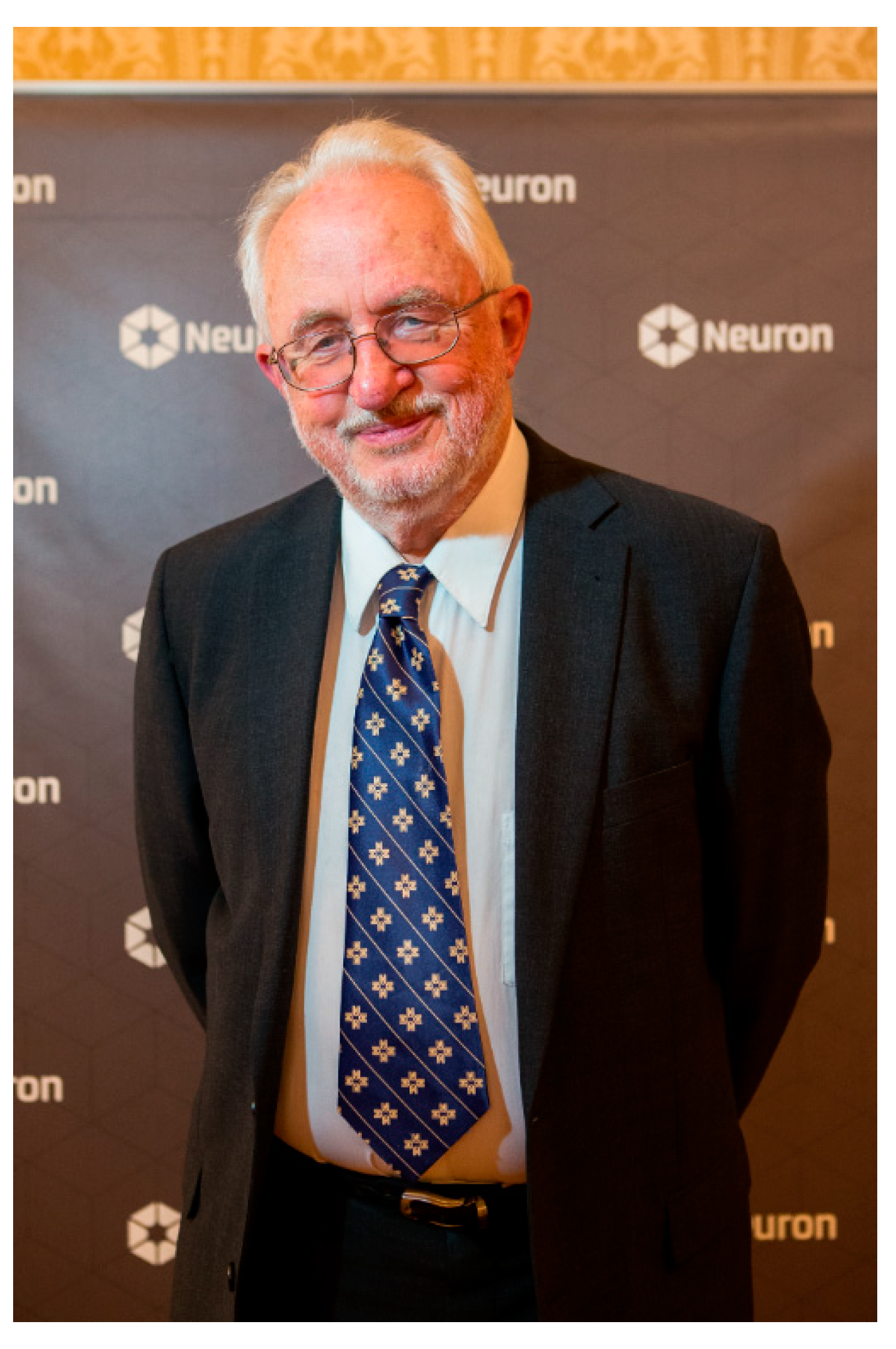
- Michl in 2016
- Born: 12 March 1939; Prague, Czechoslovakia
- Died: 13 May 2024 (aged 85); Prague, Czech Republic
- Education: Charles University; Czechoslovak Academy of Sciences
- Scientific career
- Institutions: University of Utah; University of Texas at Austin; University of Colorado Boulder; Czech Academy of Sciences
- Doctoral advisor: Rudolf Zahradník
- Other academic advisors: Václav Horák; Petr Zuman; Ralph S. Becker; Michael J. S. Dewar; Frank E. Harris; Jan Linderberg
- Notable students: Bengt Nordén (research scientist)

Josef Michl (12 March 1939 – 13 May 2024) was a Czech-American chemist.

== Life and education ==
Michl was born in Prague, which was then the capital of the short-lived Second Czechoslovak Republic (1938–1939), on 12 March 1939. This was a few days before Nazi Germany incorporated Prague and the rest of the Czech part of the country as the Protectorate of Bohemia and Moravia.

He was the oldest of four children, and born with club feet. Unable to walk due to his deformation, he endured 8 surgeries by the time he was 14, during each of which bone was scraped from his shins to build him the heels he was born without. Growing up during World War II brought many challenges as well, from a lack of food and clothes to barely surviving a bombing raid (by Americans who thought they were above Dresden). When Russia's communist party took over, life became even more challenging because his father refused to join the party. As punishment, the family's accounts were emptied and his father was removed from his position as a judge at the highest court of appeals, and relegated to being a notary public in a distant town. Not able to afford an express train ticket, he would ride three hours each way, and could only see his family on weekends. To survive, his mother found some income sorting mushrooms, and young Josef tutored older students.

He decided to become a chemist in the fourth grade, after a class demonstration where dim embers suddenly burst into large flames. He inherited a chemistry "lab" from an older boy in a neighboring flat, which he set up in a pantry with no ventilation. There, he self-taught himself, beginning with a book titled "Experiments that do not fail". He somehow survived episodes which included scarring himself with acid, dissolving a valuable silver spoon, making explosives, and causing the entire home to smell like rotten eggs for weeks. A voracious reader, his appetite for knowledge was not limited to chemistry, nor was it satisfied in school. He had many tales of teachers' varying responses when they discovered him trying to discreetly study other languages, history, or chemistry during their class.

Michl began studying chemistry at Charles University in Prague in 1956 and earned a master's degree in 1961 under Václav Horak and Petr Zuman. In 1965 he earned a Ph.D. at the Czechoslovak Academy of Sciences under Rudolf Zahradník. He worked as a Postdoctoral researcher from 1965 to 1970 for Ralph S. Becker at the University of Houston, for Michael J. S. Dewar at the University of Texas at Austin and with Frank E. Harris at the University of Utah. In the meantime he was research assistant at the Institute for Physical Chemistry of the Czechoslovak Academy of Sciences in 1967–1968 and assistant professor of Jan Linderberg at the Department of Chemistry at the Aarhus University in 1968–1969.

In 1970, Michl received his first independent professorship at the University of Utah at Salt Lake City (Research Associate Professor), in 1971 he became an associate professor and in 1975 he received a full professorship. In 1986 Michl moved to the University of Texas at Austin, but remained connected to the University of Utah as an adjunct professor. In 1991 he received a call to the University of Colorado Boulder. Since 2006, Michl has also worked as a research director for the Institute of Organic Chemistry and Biochemistry of the Czech Academy of Sciences.

Michl died in Prague on 13 May 2024, at the age of 85.

== Career ==
Michl has made important contributions to numerous areas of chemistry during his career: theoretical and experimental aspects of organic photochemistry, magnetic circular dichroism, chemistry and theory of biradicals and biradicaloids, electronic and vibrational spectroscopy with polarized light, silicon chemistry and electronic structure, theory and experiment of sputtered frozen gases, properties and theory of organic Reaction intermediates, cluster-ions, molecular building blocks for supramolecular structures and boron chemistry.

Michl was editor of the ACS journal Chemical Reviews from 1984 to 2014. He is co-author of five textbooks on Photochemistry and Polarization spectroscopy, is author of more than 570 scientific publications and holds 11 patents.

== Awards ==
- 1971–1975 Alfred P. Sloan Foundation Research Fellowship
- 1984/85 Guggenheim Fellowship
- 1986 Member of the National Academy of Sciences
- 1990 Honorary doctorate from Georgetown University
- 1992 Schrödinger Medal of the World Association of Theoretical and Computational Chemists
- 1994 Heyrovský Medal from Czech Academy of Sciences
- 1995 Gold medal from Charles University
- 1995 Honorary member of the Learned Society of the Czech Republic
- 1996 Honorary doctorate from Universität Pardubice
- 1999 Member of the American Academy of Arts and Sciences
- 2001 James Flack Norris Award from American Chemical Society
- 2001 Otto Wichterle prize from Czech chemical society
- 2004 Honorary doctorate from Masaryk University

-missing-

- 2015 Hammond Award from the Inter-American Photochemical Society
- 2016 Laureate Neuron Prize for Lifelong Contribution to Science from the Neuron Foundation
- 2019 The Medal of the Learned Society of the Czech Republic for Merit in the Development of Science (2019)
