= Jacques Lucas =

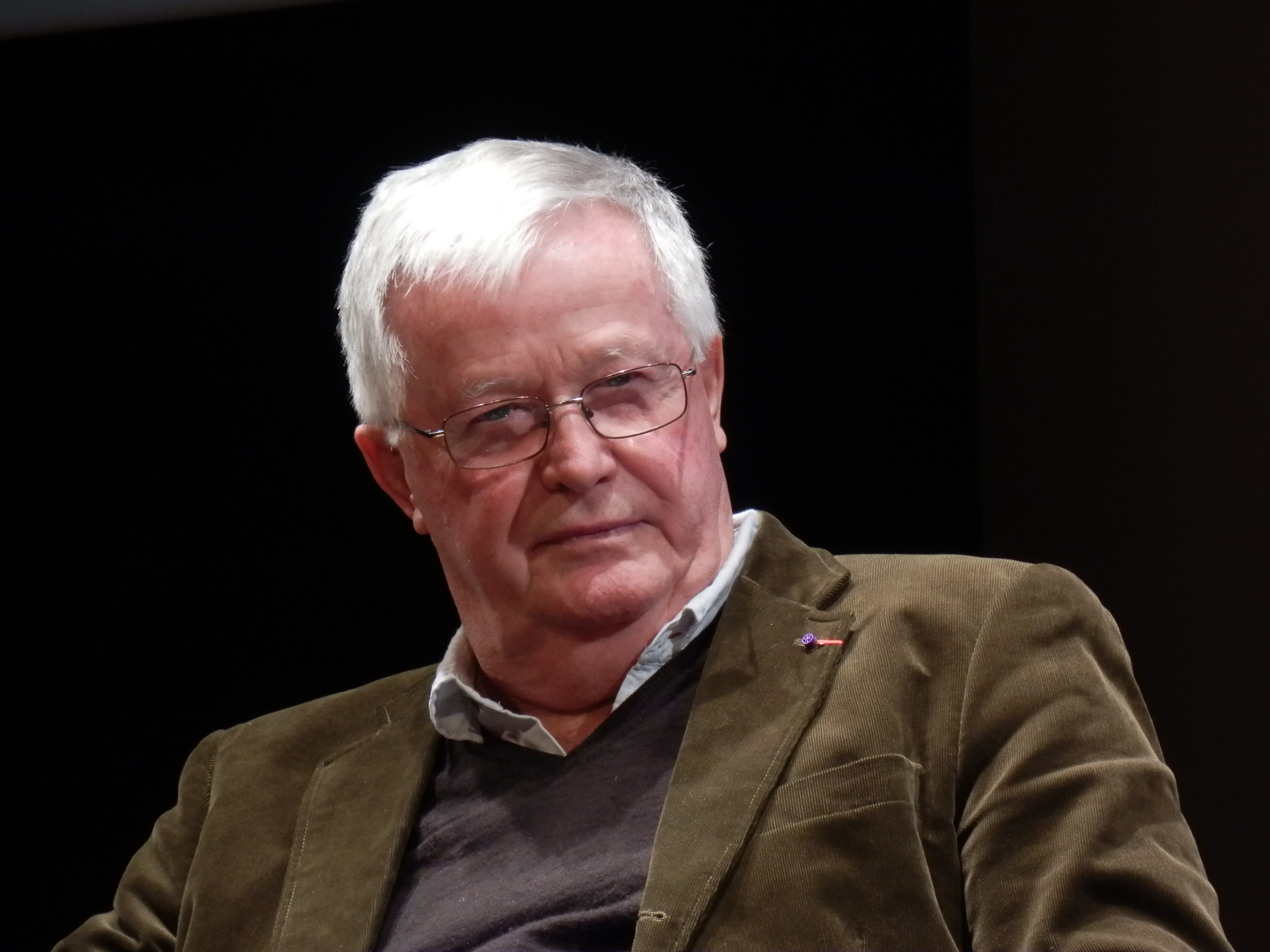
Portrait of Jacques Lucas

Jacques Lucas (born 12 June 1937 in Carhaix-Plouguer) is Professor Emeritus at the University of Rennes 1. Jacques Lucas is a solids-based chemist who specializes in the discovery of new lenses, contributing to their analysis, knowledge of their optical properties and their use in various fields (telecommunications, night vision and in situ analysis in chemistry and medicine). He is a member of the French Academy of sciences.

== Biography ==
Jacques Lucas, Doctor of Science (1964), was appointed Professor at the University of Rennes in 1968. He is Professor Emeritus at the University of Rennes where he created and directed the Laboratory of Glass and Ceramics. He has spent his entire career at this university, which has included numerous visits abroad as a visiting professor in Tucson, Kyoto and Shanghai. He has directed more than a hundred doctoral students and published more than four hundred articles in the field of solid chemistry and especially infrared transmitting glasses.

== Scientific work ==
After a career devoted to the chemistry of certain types of solids belonging to the pyrochlore and fluorinated materials family, he began studying a new family of glasses, fluoride glasses. These compounds, based on zirconium fluoride, unknown until now, attract the attention of the optical telecommunications world because of their potential for ultra-transparency. Developed in the form of fibres, their wide optical window 0.4 to 7 micrometers (μm) gives hope for an area of very low optical losses estimated at 0.02 dB/km. These glasses contain rare earths as constituent elements. Doped fibres have thus been developed for the production of laser fibres or optical amplifiers. He then began to look for other glasses containing much heavier atoms based on tellurium. In collaboration with Zhang, he discovered TeX lenses (X= Cl, Br, I). These lenses transmit light up to 20 μm. It recurs with the development of halogen-free lenses in the Te/Ge/Ge/Ga system. The development of glasses, in particular their shaping into lenses by a novel moulding process, led to the creation in the laboratory of a company called Vertex, which became Umicore IRGlass. It is located near the campus. Optical fibres based on tellurium glass have been manufactured and have made it possible to produce infrared (IR) optical sensors based on the absorption of the evanescent wave. Many molecules and biomolecules have thus been analysed in situ leading to the creation of a Diafir company created to diagnose biological fluid by infra-red. Micro-structured fibers are also developed in the laboratory and led to the creation of SelenOptics.

== Honours and awards ==
He is the recipient of numerous French and foreign awards:

- CNRS Bronze medal (1964).
- Silver medal from the Société des hautes températures et réfractaires (1978).
- Gold medal from the Société d'encouragement de l'industrie nationale (1980).
- Prize of the Schützenberger Foundation of the French Academy of sciences (1979).
- Louis Bourdon Medal for National Industry (1987).
- Ivan Peychès Prize from the French Academy of sciences (1987).
- Fellow of the American Ceramic Society and George W. Morey Award of the American Ceramic Society (1989).
- Grand Prize for Innovation and Defence (1997).
- Member of the Academia Europaea (1998).
- Grand prix Pierre-Süe de la Société française de chimie (2000).
- Honorary doctorate from the University of Pardubice, Czech Republic (2000).
- Member of the French Academy of sciences.
- Chevalier of the Légion d'honneur.
