= Dream Chemistry Award =

Award

The Dream Chemistry Award is an international competition for young scientists organized by the Institute of Organic Chemistry and Biochemistry of the Czech Academy of Sciences (IOCB Prague) and the Institute of Physical Chemistry of the Polish Academy of Sciences.

The competition was established in 2013 by Robert Hołyst and the Institute of Physical Chemistry of the PAS in Warsaw, with the next competition taking place in 2015. In 2017, IOCB Prague started co-sponsoring the event, and since then the competition has been held every year alternately in Prague and Warsaw.

The competition awards visionary projects from the field of chemistry or chemistry-related disciplines that have the ambition and potential to change the world for the better. The contest is for scientists who are younger than 38 years of age who have been nominated by respected experts. The winner of the contest receives a financial reward of €10,000. In addition, starting in 2019, the finalists receive a reward of €1,000.

The coordinators of the competition are Pavel Jungwirth from IOCB Prague and Robert Hołyst from the Institute of Physical Chemistry of the PAS. The members of the Honorary Committee include Josef Michl and Richard R. Schrock, the laureate of the 2005 Nobel Prize in Chemistry.

== Recipients ==
=== 2025 ===
Winner:

- Vít Svoboda (University of Chemistry and Technology, Prague, Czech Republic), Project: From Molecular Chirality to Petahertz Quantum Computing

Finalists:

- Xianbiao Fu (National University of Singapore, Singapore), Project: Electrochemical N_{2} Activation for Sustainable Ammonia Synthesis: Enabling the Agriculture-to-Energy Transition
- Esther Heid (TU Wien, Austria), Project: Reactivity Without Borders: A Multilingual AI for Chemistry
- Muhammad Jbara (Tel Aviv University, Israel), Project: Engineering Synthetic DNA-Binding Miniproteins to Modulate Gene Expression
- Michael M. Lerch (Stratingh Institute for Chemistry, University of Groningen, Netherlands), Project: A Chemical Operating System for Robots

=== 2024 ===
Winner:

- Richard Liu (Harvard University, USA), Project: Organic Molecules That Mimic Transition Metals for Sustainable Chemical Synthesis

Finalists:

- Maxx Arguilla (University of California Irvine, USA), Project: Bioinspired Design of Atomically Precise All-Inorganic Chains for Atomic Scale Integrated Circuitry
- Mathijs Mabesoone (Radboud University Nijmegen, Netherlands), Project: Data-Driven Evolution of Sustainable Peptide Materials
- Raya Sorkin (Tel Aviv University, Israel), Project: Novel Non Hormonal Contraceptives
- Zhiling Zheng (Massachusetts Institute of Technology, USA), Project: Programmable and Tunable Chemical Structures from Molecular Building Units

=== 2023 ===
Winner:

- Mark Levin (University of Chicago, USA), Project: Skeletal Editing: Enabling Synthesis that Matches Design

Finalists:

- Aisha Bismillah (University of York, UK), Project: Noncovalent Control of ‘Shapeshifting’ Molecules
- Moran Frenkel-Pinter (The Hebrew University of Jerusalem, Israel), Project: Emergence of Primordial Peptide Replicators
- Francesca Grisoni (Eindhoven University of Technology, Netherlands), Project: Revolutionizing AI for Molecule Discovery with Artificial Chemical Intuition
- Barak Hirshberg (Tel Aviv University, Israel), Project: A Computational Molecular Sculptor

=== 2022 ===
Winner:

- Carl Brozek (University of Oregon, USA), Project: Capturing Energy with Controllable Chaos

Finalists:

- Ahmed Badran (The Scripps Research Institute, USA), Project: Chemical Reprogramming of Biological CO_{2} Capture to Reverse Climate Change
- Claudia Contini (Imperial College London, UK), Project: Biohybrid Robotics: The Potential of Artificial Cells
- Liang Feng (Northwestern University, USA), Project: Active Artificial Molecular Factories
- Ghislaine Vantomme (Eindhoven University of Technology, Netherlands), Project: Supramolecular Materials for the Next Computing Paradigm

=== 2021 ===
Winner:

- Jarad Mason (Harvard University, USA), Project: Treating Hypoxia with Microporous Water

Finalists:

- Ahmed Badran (The Scripps Research Institute, USA), Project: Universal Codon Reassignment Using a de novo Orthogonal Genetic Code
- Johannes Bintinger (Linköping University, Sweden), Project: Star Trek SWITCH
- Luka Đorđević (University of Oregon, USA), Project: The Dark Side of Photocatalysis
- Giulio Ragazzon (Universite de Strasbourg, ISIS, France), Project: Endergonic Reactions Enabled by Catalytic Processes
- Ghislaine Vantomme (Eindhoven University of Technology, Netherlands), Project: Supramolecular Wires for Brain-Inspired Computing

=== 2020 ===
Winner:

- Claudia Bonfio (MRC Laboratory of Molecular Biology and University of Cambridge, UK), Project: Unlocking Primitive Chemical Messages

Finalists:

- Ivana Drienovska (Vrije Universiteit Amsterdam, The Netherlands), Project: New-to-Nature Reactivities in Biocatalysis: A Closer Look at Enzymatic Fluorination
- Pawel Dydio (Universite de Strasbourg, ISIS, France), Project: Artificial Intelligence for Sustainable Chemistry of the Future
- Christopher Hendon (University of Oregon, USA), Project: A Chemical Fix for Bad Beverages
- Yunyan Qiu (Northwestern University, USA), Project: Achieving the Holy Grail of Polymer Synthesis Using Catalytic Artificial Molecular Machines

=== 2019 ===
Winner:

- Yujia Qing (University of Oxford, United Kingdom), Project: Sequencing life

Finalists:

- Emiliano Cortés (LMU Munich, Germany)
- Jeffrey D. Martell (University of Wisconsin-Madison, WI, USA)
- Hannes Mikula (Vienna University of Technology, Austria)
- Yoeri van de Burgt (Eindhoven University of Technology, Netherlands)

=== 2018 ===
Winner:

- Eric D. Głowacki (Linköping University, Sweden), Project: Abundant organic catalysts for a peroxide clean energy cycle

Finalists:

- Lorenzo Albertazzi (Eindhoven University of Technology, Netherlands)
- Jeremy Luterbacher (Ecole Polytechnique Federale de Lausanne, Switzerland)
- Michael Saliba (Université de Fribourg, Switzerland)
- Alex K. Shalek (Massachusetts Institute of Technology, Cambridge, MA, USA)

=== 2017 ===
Winner:

- Jessica R. Kramer (University of Utah, Salt Lake City, UT, USA), Project: Glycocalyx engineering to probe the role of mucins in cancer

Finalists:

- Rob Ameloot (Katholieke Universiteit Leuven, Belgium),
- Justin Chalker (Flinders University, Adelaide, Australia),
- Nathan Crook (Washington University in St. Louis, MO, USA),
- Yogesh Surendranath (Massachusetts Institute of Technology, Cambridge, MA, USA)

=== 2015 ===
Winner:

- Mircea Dincă (Massachusetts Institute of Technology, Cambridge, MA, USA), Project: A panacea for catalysis?

Finalists:

- Denis Menshykau (Bayer Technology Services, Leverkusen, Germany)
- Eric D. Głowacki (Linköping University, Sweden)
- Yogesh Surendranath (Massachusetts Institute of Technology, Cambridge, MA, USA)
- Jiayin Yuan (Max Planck Institute of Colloids and Interfaces, Potsdam, Germany)

=== 2013 ===
Winner:

- Evan Spruijt (University of Oxford, United Kingdom), Project: The dream of life

Finalists:

- Hal Alper (University of Texas at Austin, TX, USA)
- Peggy P. K. Lo (City University of Hong Kong, China)
- Eugen Andreiadis (Atomic Energy and Alternative Energies Commission, Gif-sur-Yvette, France)
- Paul Blainey (Massachusetts Institute of Technology, Cambridge, MA, USA)
