= Rudolf Zahradník =

Czech chemist (1928–2020)

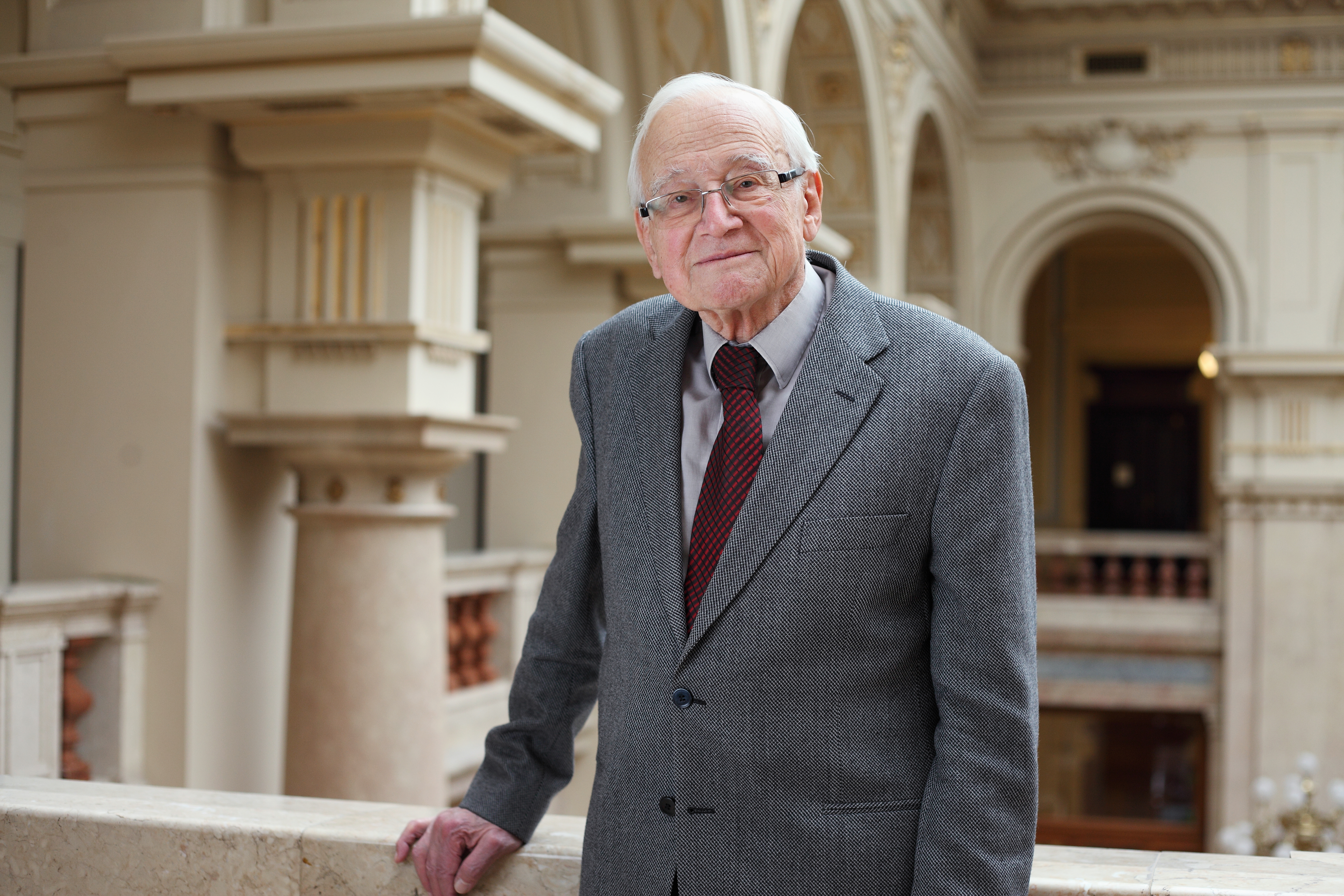
- Zahradník in 2012
- Born: 20 October 1928; Bratislava, Czechoslovakia
- Died: 31 October 2020 (aged 92)
- Education: University of Chemistry and Technology, Prague
- Spouse(s): Milena Zahradníková (m. ?; died 2020)
- Awards: See Awards and honours
- Scientific career
- Fields: Quantum chemistry
- Workplaces: Charles University; Czech Academy of Sciences; Clarkson University; J Heyrovsky Institute of Physical Chemistry
- Academic advisors: Jaroslav Koutecký
- Doctoral students: Josef Michl; Pavel Jungwirth
- Other notable students: Angela Merkel; Joachim Sauer

Rudolf Zahradník (20 October 1928 – 31 October 2020) was a Czech chemist in the field of quantum chemistry and molecular spectroscopy. He held research positions at the Institute of Occupational Medicine and went on to serve as the first director of the J Heyrovsky Institute of Physical Chemistry, president of the Czech Academy of Sciences and chairman of the Learned Society of the Czech Republic, after the Velvet Revolution. During the 1980s, he taught future German leader Angela Merkel, who was then on an internship in Czechoslovakia. He held a doctorate from the University of Chemistry and Technology, Prague.

== Early life and career ==
Zahradník was born in Bratislava (then in Czechoslovakia, now in Slovakia) on 20 October 1928. He was a member of the Junák scout movement and decided to study chemistry when he read an article on invisible ink at grammar school. He graduated from the University of Chemistry and Technology, Prague in 1952, one of his teachers there was Jaroslav Koutecký. Four years later he obtained a Ph.D. in chemistry from the same university. Having previously been considered a bad influence on his students, Zahradník was able to obtain a research position after the Khrushchev Thaw relaxed Soviet restrictions on Czechoslovakia. He studied the relations between chemical structure and biological activity at the Institute of Occupational Medicine and theory of chemical reactivity and molecular spectroscopy at the Institute of Physical Chemistry of the Czechoslovak Academy of Sciences before being awarded a Doctor of Science degree by them in 1967. In 1959, Zahradník joined the faculty of Natural Sciences at Charles University and in 1961 served as a head of the Applied Quantum Chemistry Group at the Institute of Physical Chemistry, Czechoslovak Academy of Sciences. In the 1980s he taught Angela Merkel while she was on an internship in Czechoslovakia several times. They stayed in contact and she also visited him on his ninetieth birthday.

== Career after the Velvet Revolution ==
Between 1990 and 1993 Zahradník served as the first director of the J Heyrovsky Institute of Physical Chemistry before joining Clarkson University. During this period he has been described as "pushing forward the frontiers of quantum chemistry" and helped to bring young chemists into the field. From 1993 to 2001 he was president of the Czech Academy of Sciences and in 1994 became founding chairman of the Learned Society of the Czech Republic, holding the post until 1997. He was awarded the Czech Republic's Medal of Merit in 1998 and the Austrian Decoration for Science and Art in 1999.

Zahradník was a recipient of a doctorate honoris causa from the TU Dresden and University of Fribourg (both in 1993), and from the University of Pardubice and Georgetown University in 1994 and 1996 respectively. He was also honored with doctorate honoris causa degrees from Charles and Clarkson universities in 1998.

He published more than 350 papers and 10 books especially on quantum chemistry problems. He died on 31 October 2020.

== Awards and honors ==
- Fellow of the Learned Society of the Czech Republic
- Member of the International Academy of Quantum Molecular Science
- Fellow of the World Association of Theoretical Organic Chemists (1982)
- Member of the Academy of Quantum Molecular Sciences (1982)
- Medal of Slovak Institute of Technology (1989)
- J. Heyrovsky Gold Medal of the Czechoslovak Academy of Sciences (1990)
- Member of the European Academy of Arts, Sciences and Literature (1992)
- Gold Medal of the Slovak Academy of Sciences (1994)
- Member of the European Academy of Environmental Affairs (1994)
- Corresponding member of the Croatian Academy of Sciences and Arts (1994)
- Founding member of the Engineering Academy of the Czech Republic (1995)
- Gold Medal of Charles University, Prague (1995)
- Marin Drinov Medal, Bulgarian Academy of Sciences (1996)
- Member of the European Academy of Sciences and Arts (1997)
- Honorary member of the Swiss Chemical Society (1998)
- Medal, J.M. Marci Spectroscopical Society (1998)
- Elected member of the Academia Europaea (1999)
- Austrian 1st Class Honorary Cross for Science and Arts (1999)
- Josef Hlávka Medal (2009)
