= Jessica Kramer =

American biomedical engineer

Jessica R. Kramer
- Born: Salt Lake City, Utah, U.S.
- Education: University of Utah; University of California, Los Angeles; University of California, Berkeley; Stanford University
- Scientific career
- Fields: Biomaterials, Polymer Chemistry, Glycobiology, Bioconjugations
- Workplaces: University of Utah
- Website: The Kramer Lab

Jessica R. Kramer is an American biomedical engineer working as an Assistant Professor of Bio-engineering and Adjunct Assistant Professor of Pharmaceutics and Pharmaceutical Chemistry at the University of Utah. Kramer’s research lab focuses on the synthesis and application of glycopolypeptides.

== Education ==
Kramer attended the University of Utah where she received an Honors Bachelor’s Degree of Science in Chemistry, following the biochemistry track. Kramer’s research under C. Dale Poulter contributed to her honors thesis, The Binding Specificity of Phospholipase C. She then pursued a Ph.D. in Organic Chemistry at the University of California, Los Angeles, where she worked with Dr. Timothy Deming as her research advisor. After graduate school, Kramer was awarded a University of California Chancellor’s Postdoctoral Fellowship at the University of California, Berkeley while working with Carolyn Bertozzi. Kramer was also awarded a National Institute of Health NRSA Postdoctoral Fellowship. During her fellowship at UC Berkeley, the Bertozzi lab moved to Stanford University, where Kramer continued her research.

== Career and research ==
Kramer began her career working in industrial research at Echelon Biosciences Inc. in Salt Lake City, Utah as a staff scientist during her undergraduate studies. She was part of a team synthesizing isoprenoid, phosphoinositide, and phospholipid product lines. She also interned at HRL Laboratories in Malibu, California, where she worked with microbial fuel cells.

Kramer has contributed to the field of glycopolypeptide research. During her graduate studies, she and Deming produced the first living polymerization of glycosylated NCAs utilizing C-linked sugars and linking lysine via amides to improve stability. These can be used as mimics of natural glycoproteins. Additionally, she developed a purification method for α-amino acid-N-carboxyanhydride (NCA) monomers using flash chromatography. This purification method results in improved yields compared to recrystallization and is useful for purifying NCAs that are difficult to crystallize. Kramer has also researched bioconjugation reactions of methionine, determining different electrophiles that can react efficiently with methionine, and the lack of pH effects.

While completing her postdoctoral fellowship under Bertozzi, she studied the synthesis of protein glycodomain mimetics. Kramer designed a synthetic route to produce mucin glycodomain constructs using NCA polymerization. This research furthered mucin knowledge regarding its structure and properties. With the Bertozzi lab, Kramer explored design and synthesis of specific glycopolypeptide ligands for receptors that play a critical role in microbial pathogen immunity. This was accomplished by using polymerization of glycosylated N-carboxyanhydrides.

Currently, the Kramer Lab at the University of Utah is developing methods for glycocalyx engineering to study the surface of cancerous cells with long-term goals of new diagnostics and treatments for various types of cancer. Additionally, Kramer’s lab is researching cryopreservation of tissue and whole organs, as well as the development of synthetic human mucus.

== Awards and honors ==
- NSF Career Award (2019)
- International Dream Chemistry Award (2017)
- Henkel Award for Outstanding Graduate Research in Polymer Chemistry, American Chemical Society (2015)
- Norma Stoddart Prize, UCLA Department of Chemistry (2013)
