= Mircea Dincă =

Romanian-American inorganic chemist

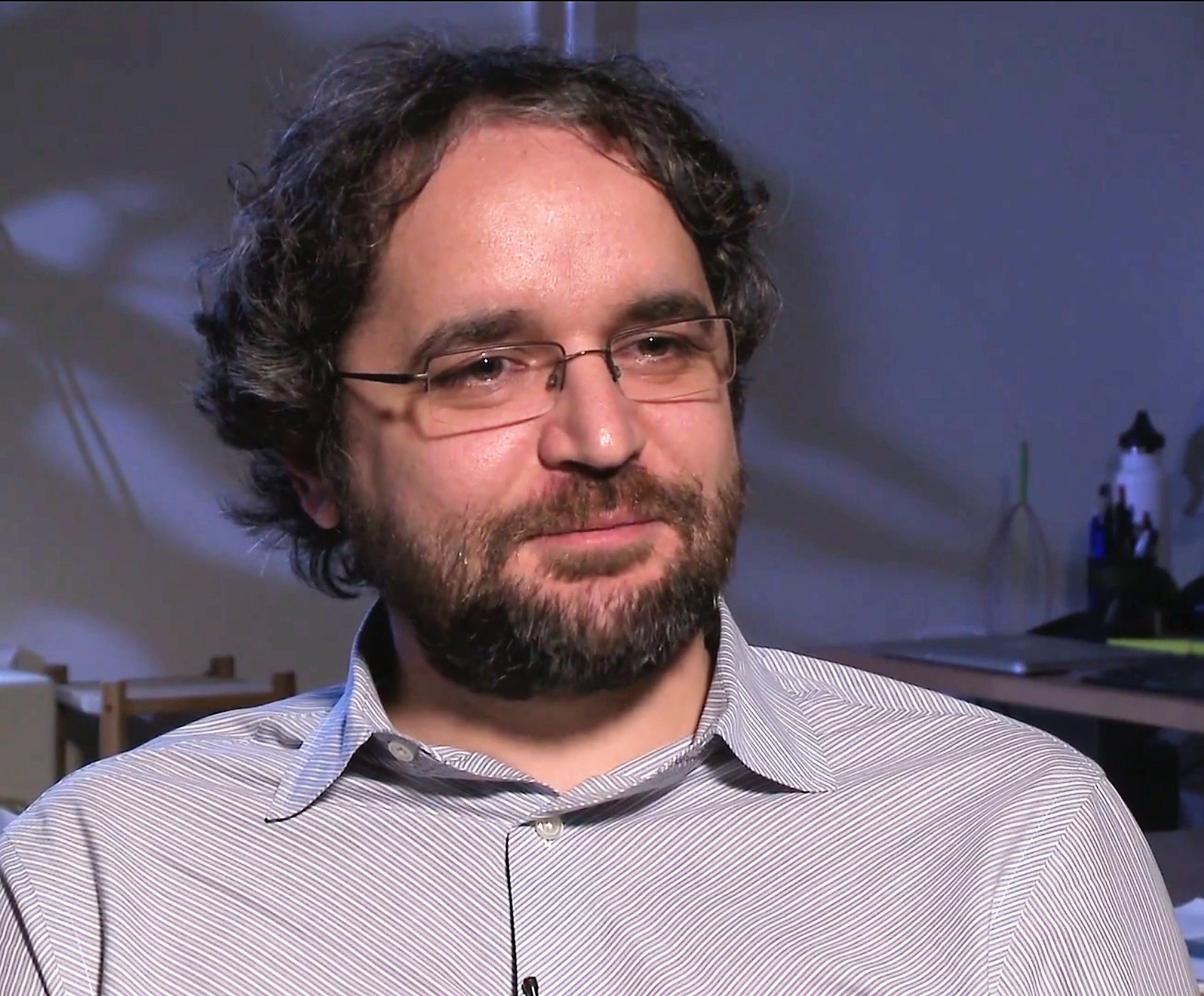
- Dincă on receiving the 2016 Alan T. Waterman Award.
- Born: Făgăraș, Brașov County, Romania
- Education: Princeton University (B.A.) (2003); University of California, Berkeley (Ph.D) (2008)
- Awards: ACS Award in Pure Chemistry (2016); Alan T. Waterman Award (2016); Dream Chemistry Award (2015); Camille Dreyfus Teacher-Scholar Award (2014); Cottrell Scholar Award (2014); Alfred P. Sloan Research Fellowship (2014); 3M Non-Tenured Faculty Award (2013); DOE Young Investigator Award (2011)
- Scientific career
- Fields: Metal-organic frameworks
- Thesis: Hydrogen Storage in Microporous Metal-Organic Frameworks with Exposed Metal Sites (2008)
- Doctoral advisor: Jeffrey R. Long
- Other academic advisors: Jeffrey Schwartz, Daniel G. Nocera
- Website: Link

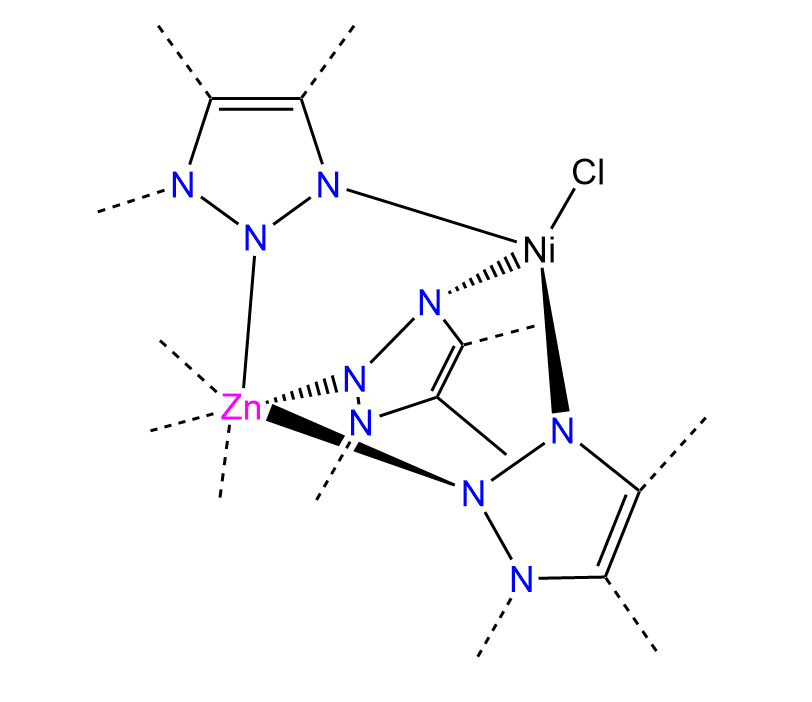
Figure 1: Ni-MFU‑4l: single-site heterogeneous catalyst.

Mircea Dincă (born 1980) is a Romanian-American inorganic chemist. He is the Alexander Stewart 1886 Professor of Chemistry at Princeton University. At Princeton, Dincă leads a research group that focuses on the synthesis of functional metal-organic frameworks (MOFs), which possess conductive, catalytic, and other material-favorable properties.

== Early life and education ==
Mircea Dincă was born in Făgăraș, Romania. His passion for chemistry began in his chemistry class in 7th grade, where he had a "dedicated teacher that did spectacular demonstrations with relatively limited regard for safety". In 1998, he represented Romania at the International Science Olympiad (Chemistry) in Yakutsk, Russia, where he won first prize.

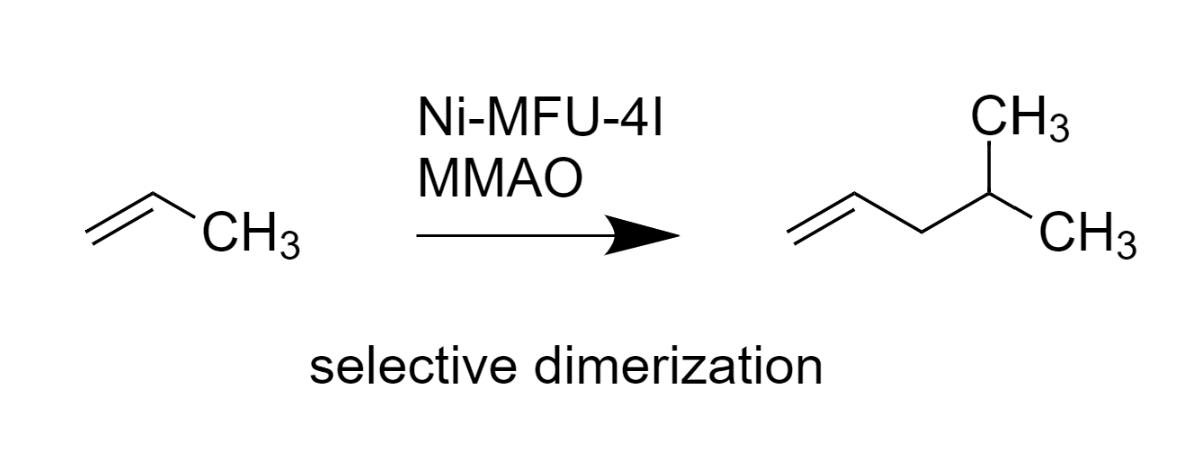
Figure 2: Selective dimerization of propylene to branched hexenes using Ni-MFU-4l.

After high school, Dincă was offered a scholarship from Princeton University and moved to New Jersey in 1999. At Princeton, he worked with Jeffrey Schwartz, conducting research on materials science. After graduating magna cum laude in 2003, Dincă went on to the University of California, Berkeley to attend the Chemistry doctorate program, where he worked with chemistry professor Jeffrey R. Long on increasing H_{2} adsorption in metal-organic frameworks with mobile hydrogen storage applications. He graduated with his Ph.D. from Berkeley in 2008.

== Career ==
Dincă completed his postdoc studies at MIT, where he was promoted to associate professor in 2010 and, in 2017, tenured. Until 2024, he was the W. M. Keck Professor of Chemistry. In 2025, he joined the faculty at Princeton University.

== Research ==
Dincă's research primarily focuses on electrical conductivity of MOF's, which was previously unknown and resulted in a new categorization of such materials with "charge mobility values". His focus is on the exploration of increasing electrical conductivity capacities through the marriage of organic and inorganic materials to assemble hybrid MOF's.

Research includes exploring electrochemical cycling through strongly adhering, electroactive metal–organic framework thin films to vary results, such as multicolored electrochromic responses and transparent to dark behavior.
