= Pavel Jungwirth =

Czech chemist and university educator (1966–2026)

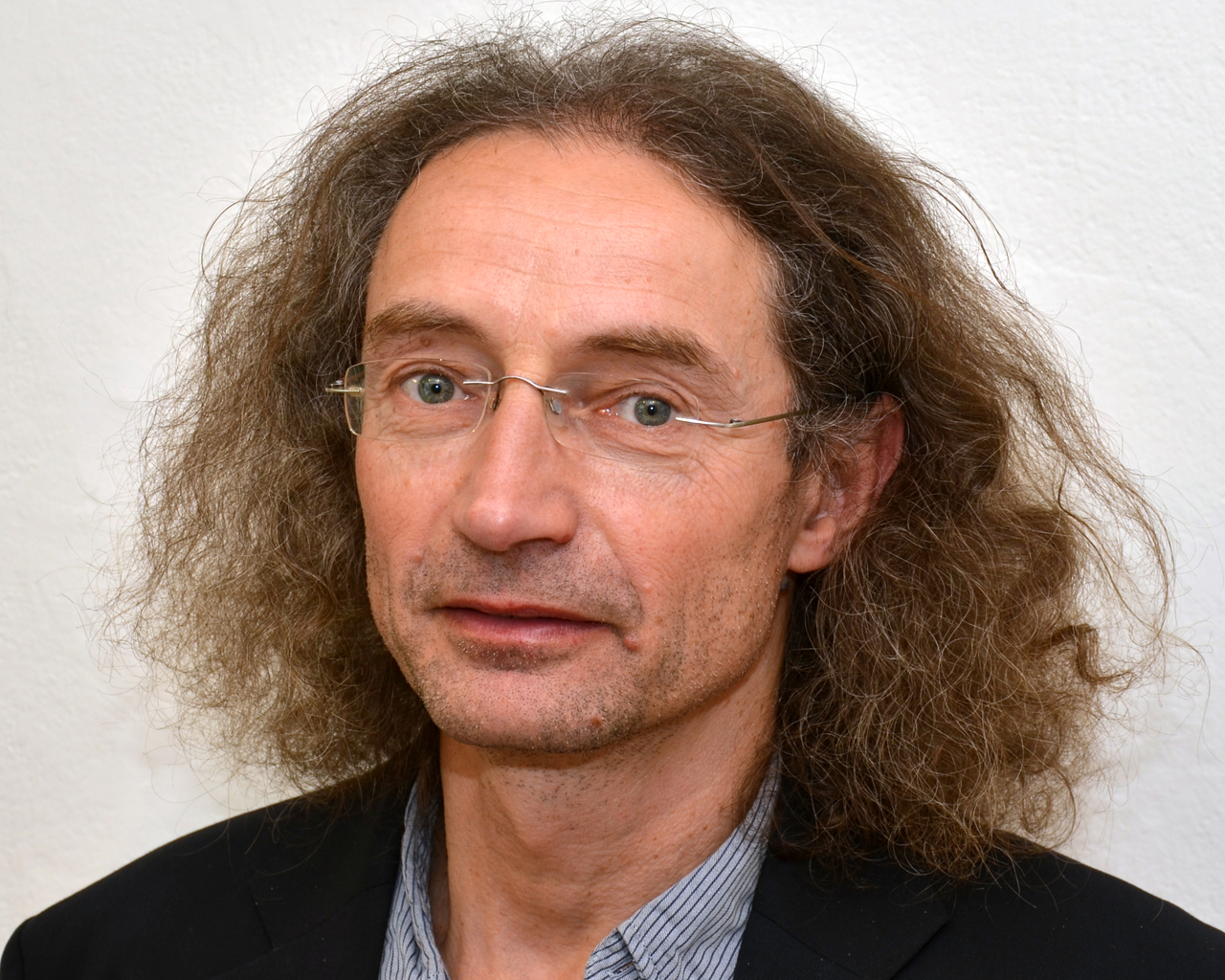
- Born: 20 May 1966; Prague, Czechoslovakia
- Died: 23 July 2026 (aged 60)
- Education: Czech Academy of Sciences (Ph.D. 1993)
- Spouse: Iva (née Kratochvilova)
- Awards: Otto Wichterle Prize (2002), Spiers Memorial Prize from the Royal Society for Chemistry (2008), Member of the Learned Society of the Czech Republic (2009)
- Scientific career
- Fields: Organic chemistry Physical chemistry Computational chemistry
- Workplaces: Institute of Organic Chemistry and Biochemistry of the Czech Academy of Sciences
- Doctoral advisor: Rudolf Zahradník
- Website: jungwirth.group.uochb.cz/en

Pavel Jungwirth (20 May 1966 – 23 July 2026) was a Czech physical chemist. From 2004 until his death in 2026, he was the head of the Senior Research Group at the Institute of Organic Chemistry and Biochemistry (IOCB) of the Czech Academy of Sciences. He was also a professor in the Faculty of Mathematics and Physics at Charles University from 2000 and a senior editor of the Journal of Physical Chemistry from 2009-2023. He was popularly known for studying the explosive reaction between alkali metals, such as sodium and potassium, and water; his research on this subject indicates that these reactions result from a Coulomb explosion. He and his colleagues have also discovered a way to slow down this reaction, which they used to determine the source of a blue flash that is briefly produced during the reaction.

Jungwirth was a coordinator of an international science competition Dream Chemistry Award, and appeared on the Academy of Sciences podcast.

Jungwirth died by suicide on 23 July 2026, at the age of 60.
