= Jan Perner =

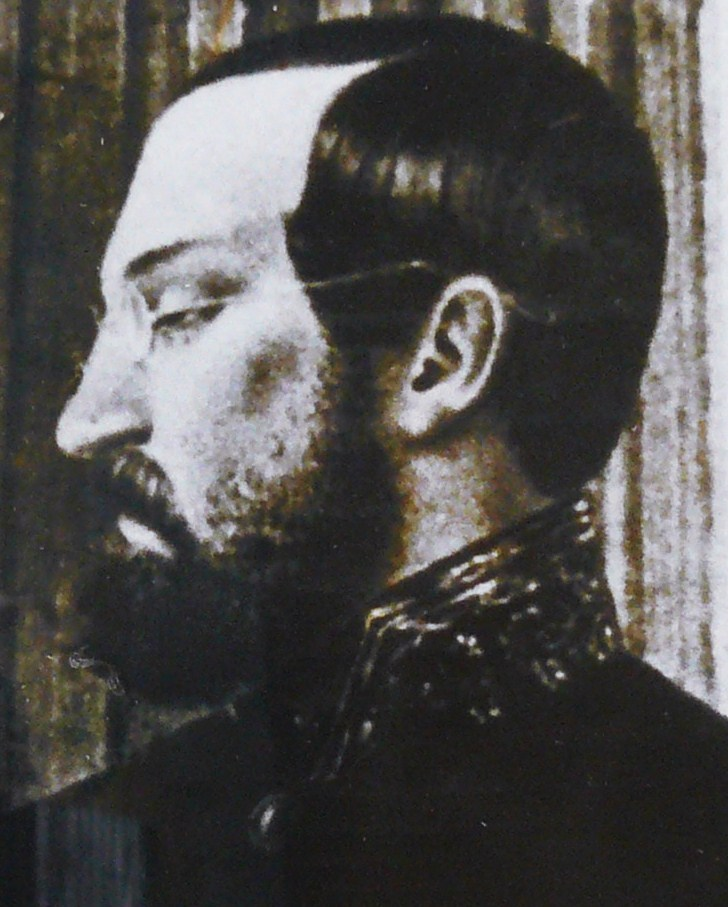
Jan Perner

Jan Perner (7 September 1815 – 10 September 1845) was a Czech railway engineer. Between 1842 and 1845, Perner was responsible for construction of several railways in the Austrian Empire.

== Career ==
Perner was born on 7 September 1815 in Bratčice. He was born to a watermill owner and his wife. During 1830–33 he studied at an engineering school in Prague led by František Josef Gerstner. When Gerstner looked for engineers for construction of railways in Sankt Petersburg area of Imperial Russia, Perner joined the project (1836). Due to problems in communication with Gerstner he left in the same year. In 1837 Perner began work at the state railway company and was gradually promoted to take responsibility for construction works. In 1842 he started to design and oversee construction of important railways between Prague–Pardubice–Olomouc and Prague–Dresden.

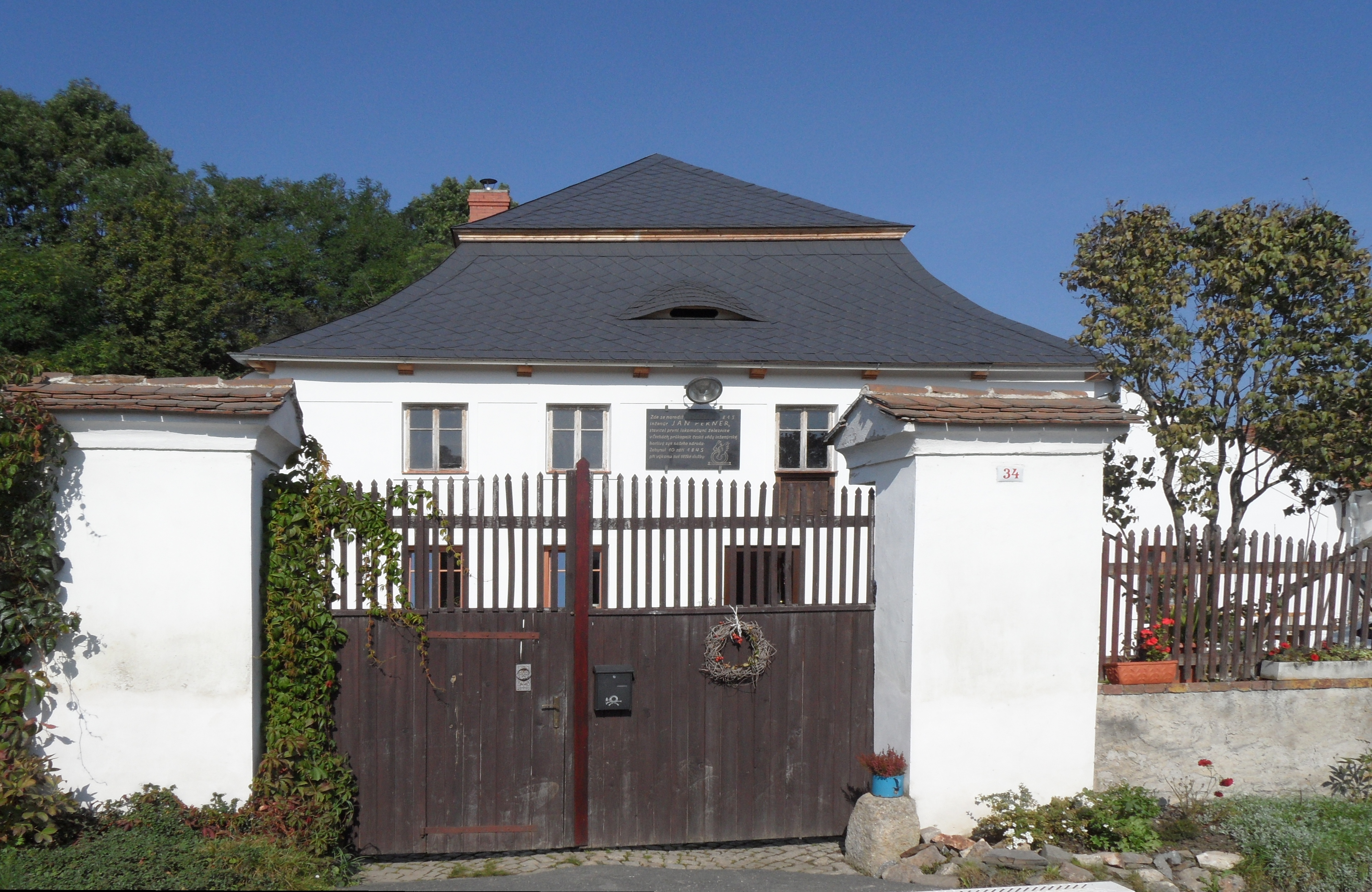
Watermill in Bratčice: birthplace of Jan Perner

The railway from Prague to Pardubice (over 100 km) was finished in 1845. On 9 September 1845, while Perner was returning from an inspection trip he looked out of the window of a moving train (near Choceň). His head hit a pole, and he was severely injured and died the next day in Pardubice. He has the dubious fame of being the first person to die in a railway accident in Bohemia. Today one of the faculties of University of Pardubice is named after him: Jan Perner Transport Faculty (Dopravní fakulta Jana Pernera) . An InterCity class train of railway operator České dráhy bears the name Jan Perner.
