= Blanka Říhová =

Czech immunologist (born 1942)

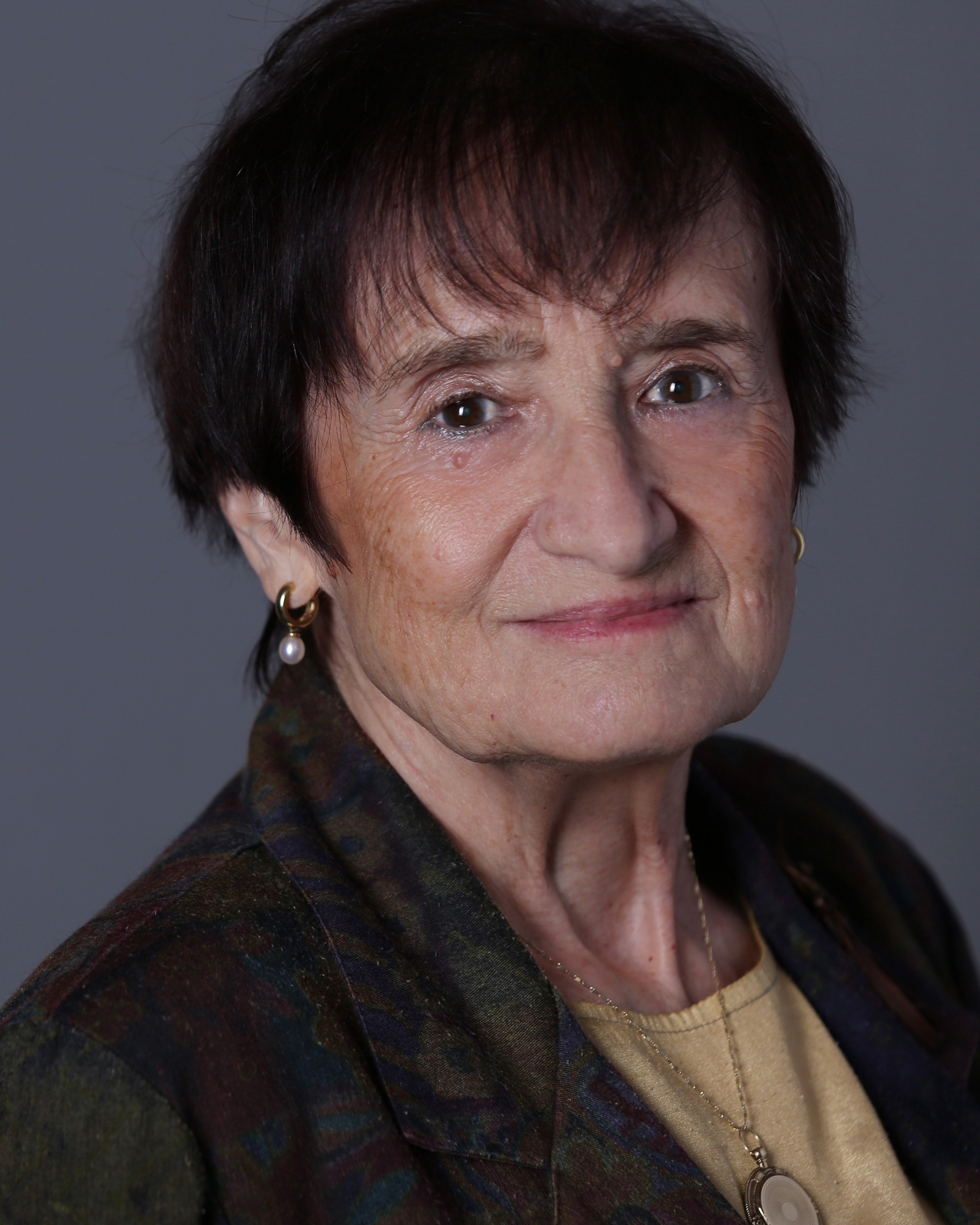
- Born: October 21, 1942 (age 83)
- Education: Charles University
- Scientific career
- Workplaces: Charles University; University of Utah; Czech Academy of Sciences; Czechoslovak Academy of Sciences
- Thesis: Regulace imunitní odpovědi a možnosti jejího ovlivnění = A. Genetická kontrola protilátkové odpovědi B. Imunomodulace směrovanými léčivy

Blanka Říhová (born October 21, 1942) is a Czech immunologist. Her research involves the development of targeted drug delivery methods for cancer. She is the former director at the Institute of Microbiology of the Czech Academy of Sciences. In 2018 Říhová was made President of the Learned Society of the Czech Republic.

== Early life and education ==
Říhová was born in Prague. She studied science at the Charles University. She remained there for her graduate studies, and joined the Czechoslovak Academy of Sciences in 1964. On December 2, 1969, she defended her doctorate at the Institute of Microbiology of the Czechoslovak Academy of Sciences.

== Research and career ==
She spent much of her career in the United States, where she worked in Seattle, Salt Lake City and New York City. She visited the University of Utah where she worked alongside Jindřich Kopeček. In 1994 Říhová was appointed to the faculty at the Department of Physiology and Developmental Biology since 1994. Her research has included genetics, oncology, toxicology and medical biochemistry.

The first chemotherapy treatment was made available in 1958, and since then, several different types have been considered. Whilst chemotherapy can suppress the size of tumours, because it is non-specific there are several well-known side effects. The cytotoxic compounds used in chemotherapy are particularly damaging to cells which quickly divide, include hair cells and those of the reproductive systems. Říhová has worked on precision cancer treatments that can target cancer cells but not trigger a cytokine storm. This form of targeted drug delivery makes use of a polymer-based macromolecular prodrug, where antibodies that can identify tumour cells and cytotoxic anti-cancer drugs are attached to the backbone. This allows for the treatment to selectively attack and destroy cancer cells, by using the antibody to tag the tumour, and selectively inducing an immune response. By encouraging the immune response within the tumour cells themselves, Říhová avoids any of the side effects of chemotherapy. This type of treatment may decrease the amount of time that cancer patients need to spend in hospital. She believes that this type of treatment is best suited for patients with breast cancer, lung cancer and colorectal cancer. In 2011 she was a finalist for the European Inventor Award.

During the COVID-19 pandemic, Říhová provided expert commentary on the immune system response to SARS-CoV-2. She called for people to wear face masks to prevent the spread of the disease, because asymptomatic carriers will not know that they are vectors. In late April Říhová remarked that lifting of strict quarantine should only happen gradually, during which time there should be constant monitoring and testing.

=== Professional service ===
Říhová was made Head of Research at the Czechoslovak Academy of Sciences in 1990. She served as Chair of the Czech Immunological Society from 1994 to 2000 she sat on the Academic Council of the Academy of Sciences of the Czech Republic, from 2004 to 2007 she was the vice-chairwoman of the Learned Society of the Czech Republic. Since 2007 she has acted as Head of the Department of Immunology. She was made European Ambassador for Creativity and Innovation in 2009. In 2018 she was elected President of the Learned Society of the Czech Republic. She is a member of the scientific council of the Czech Academy of Sciences.

== Awards and honours ==
- 1987 – Jan Evangelista Purkyně medal of the Czechoslovak Academy of Sciences for achieved results in biology
- 1996 – Elected a member of the Learned Society of the Czech Republic
- 2005 – Česká hlava Invention Award for Polymeric Drugs with Cytostatic and Immunomodulatory Effects
- 2006 – Medal of the Russian Academy of Natural Sciences "For Merit in Public Health"
- 2012 – Čestná medaile De scientia et humanitate optime meritis
- 2013 – Medal of the Learned Society of the Czech Republic
- 2017 – TOP Women of the Czech Republic competition

== Selected publications ==
- Etrych, Tomáš; Jelı́nková, Markéta; Řı́hová, Blanka; Ulbrich, Karel (2001-05-18). "New HPMA copolymers containing doxorubicin bound via pH-sensitive linkage: synthesis and preliminary in vitro and in vivo biological properties". Journal of Controlled Release. 73 (1): 89–102. doi:10.1016/S0168-3659(01)00281-4. PMID 11337062.
- Ulbrich, K; Šubr, V; Strohalm, J; Plocová, D; Jelı́nková, M; Řı́hová, B (2000-02-14). "Polymeric drugs based on conjugates of synthetic and natural macromolecules". Journal of Controlled Release. 64 (1–3): 63–79. doi:10.1016/S0168-3659(99)00141-8. PMID 10640646.
- Rihova, B; Bilej, M; Vetvicka, V; Ulbrich, K; Strohalm, J; Kopecek, J; Duncan, R (1989). "Biocompatibility of N-(2-hydroxypropyl) methacrylamide copolymers containing adriamycinImmunogenicity, and effect on haematopoietic stem cells in bone marrow in vivo and mouse splenocytes and human peripheral blood lymphocytes in vitro". Biomaterials. 10 (5): 335–342. doi:10.1016/0142-9612(89)90075-6. PMID 2765631.
