= Jiří Bičák =

Czech physicist (1942–2024)

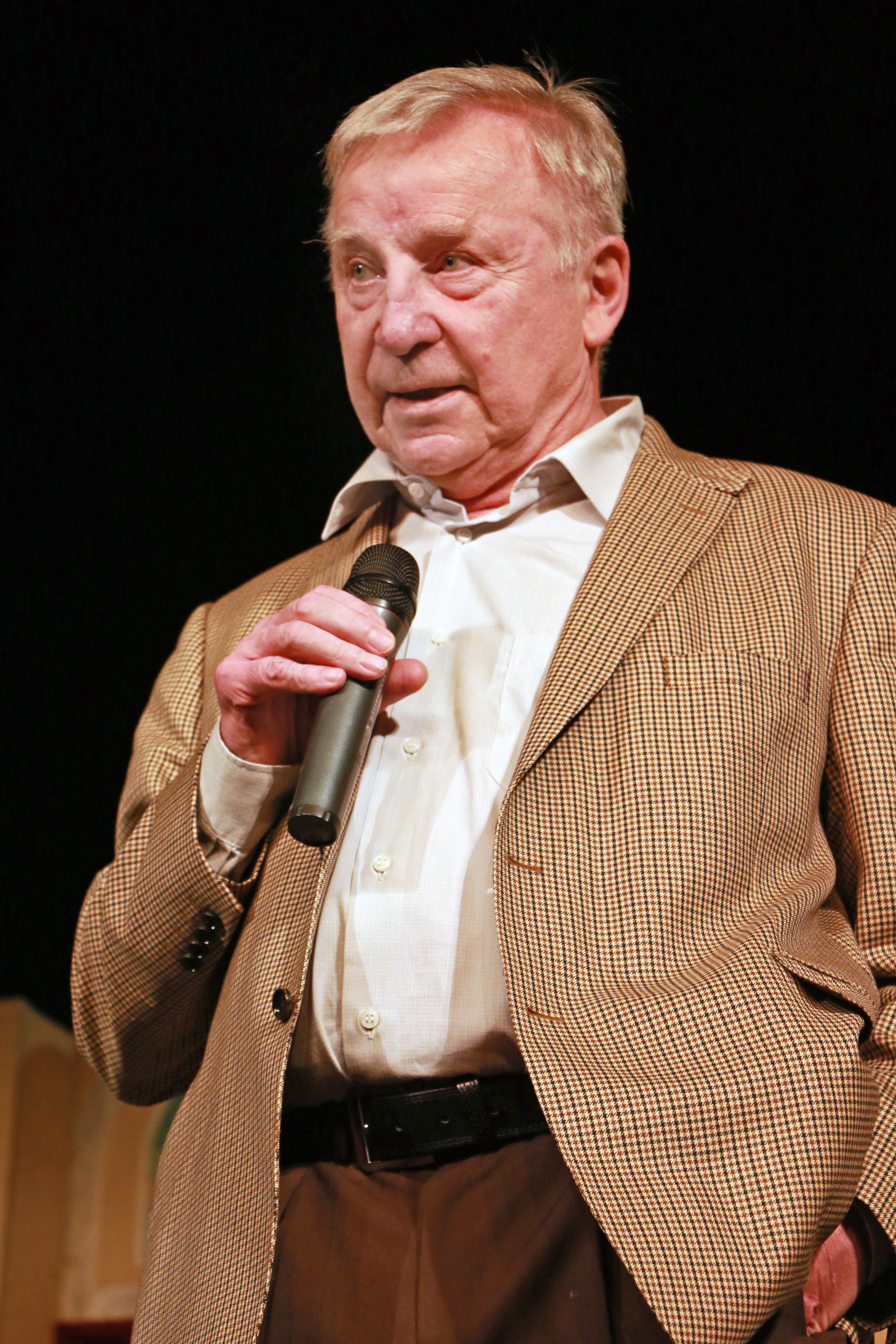
Bičák in 2016

Jiří Bičák (7 January 1942, Prague – 26 January 2024) was a Czech physicist at Charles University, fellow of the American Physical Society and President of the Learned Society of the Czech Republic. Bičák died on 26 January 2024, at the age of 82.
