= Learned Society of the Czech Republic =

The Learned Society of the Czech Republic (Czech: Učená společnost České republiky) is an association of distinguished scholars of the Czech Republic from all scientific disciplines. Its goal is to support free conduct of research and furtherance of scientific knowledge. The Society was established in 1994 as a successor of The Royal Bohemian Society of Learning (founded in the end of the 18th century) and the Czech Academy of Sciences and Arts (founded in 1890).

Society membership is either as a Fellow (limited to 111 Fellows) or as an Honorary Fellow. The first elected president of the Learned Society of the Czech Republic was Rudolf Zahradník (1994–1997). Succeeding elected presidents were Josef Koutecký (1997–2002), František Šmahel (2002–2004), Jiří Grygar (2004–2008), Helena Illnerová (2008–2010), Václav Pačes (2010–2012), Petr Pokorný (2012–2014), Jiří Bičák (2014–2016), Zdeněk Havlas (2016–2018), Blanka Říhová (2018–2020), Pavel Jungwirth (2020–2022), Libor Grubhoffer (2022–2024), and Martin Loebl (2024-2026).

According to Act 83/1990, the Learned Society of the Czech Republic is a civic association. Its executive body is the Council of the Society.

The Czech Learned Society is a member of the Council of Scientific Societies of the Czech Republic.

The address of the Secretariat of the Learned Society of the Czech Republic is Národní 3, 110 00 Praha 1, Czech Republic,
