= Petr Zuman =

Czech chemist (1926–2021)

- Education: Charles University
- Known for: Electrochemistry
- Awards: Benedetti–Pichler award (1975)
- Scientific career
- Fields: Chemistry
- Workplaces: Clarkson University
- Doctoral advisor: Jaroslav Heyrovský

Petr Zuman (13 January 1926 – 24 June 2021) was a Czech chemist.

Born and raised in Prague, the Second World War severely impacted Zuman and his family while he was a teenager. In 1939, when he was 13 years old, the Germans occupied Czechoslovakia and sent his father to a concentration camp. In 1943–1944, Zuman worked in a Prague laboratory for the Research Institute of the Sugar Industry. Enjoying the work, he wrote three papers on the alkaline cleavage of sucrose. However, in June 1944 Zuman was himself sent to a concentration camp. He was liberated from the camp on May 6, 1945, and then returned to Prague.

== Biography ==
Zuman enrolled at Charles University in Prague in 1945 and graduated in early 1948. After this he joined the research group of Jaroslav Heyrovský (Nobel Prize in chemistry 1959) and was awarded a RNDr (equivalent to a PhD) in 1950. He was one of the first researchers in the newly created Central Polarographic Institute in Prague and within a few years he was appointed Head of the Organic Polarography Division. In 1960, Petr was awarded the Doctor of Science degree by the Czechoslovak Academy of Sciences.

Following the 1967 political upheaval in Czechoslovakia, Zuman obtained a three-and-one-half-year appointment as a research fellow at the University of Birmingham in England. In 1970 he accepted a position in the Chemistry Department at Clarkson University in Potsdam, New York, where he remained until his retirement. Post-retirement Zuman has been an emeritus Professor at Clarkson University and continued to contribute to the chemistry department.

Special Field: Organic electroanalytical chemistry, organic reaction mechanisms.

Research Interests - Electrochemistry

Mechanisms of some organic reactions are investigated using polarographic, voltametric and kinetic measurements. Examples of recently studied reactions are: Acid-base, hydration-dehydration and tautomeric equilibria involving 1,3,5- and 1,2,4-triazines, selenous acid and mytomicin C, reactions of bile acids, cholesterol, and other sterols in strongly acidic media, additions of nucleophiles, such as glutathione, to nitrosobenzene, etc. Most of these studies involve biologically important compounds and their investigations are essential both for development of analytical methods and for their contribution to a better understanding of biological activity.

Another active area are studies of electroreduction and electrooxidation of some organic compounds, such as aromatic nitrocompounds, various pesticides including maleic hydrazide, 1,3,5- and 1,2,4-triazines, selenous acid, mitomycin C, phenols, etc. Structure-reactivity relationships are investigated, for example the transfer of electronic effects through an N-N single bond, ring formation of some 2-amino-1,4-benzoquinones, or interactions between two reducible groups in a molecule. Polarographic reduction of pesticides has been used to study their adsorption on lignin, to determine their bioavailability in applications in forest nurseries. Studies of alkaline cleavage of lignin at room temperature will form a basis for the use of lignin (which is a renewable raw material) for future industrial applications.

He has won numerous awards, including the prestigious 1975 Benedetti–Pichler award given annually by the American Microchemical Society, as well as numerous visiting professorships at institutions around the world. He has been a prolific author with well over 400+ papers and 15 books published, many considered classics in electrochemical analysis. Petr has been a member of the editorial board of the Microchemical Journal, has published on a regular basis, and has critically reviewed many manuscripts and books. He had many master and Ph.D. students including James Rusling, William James Bover, Cetin Karakus, Melek Sirin Baymak, Hayati Celik, Nuha Salem and many more. He was fluent in five languages - Czech, German, English, Polish and Serbo-Croat.

Zuman died June 24, 2021, in Potsdam, New York.
