= Bratčice (Kutná Hora District) =

- Municipality
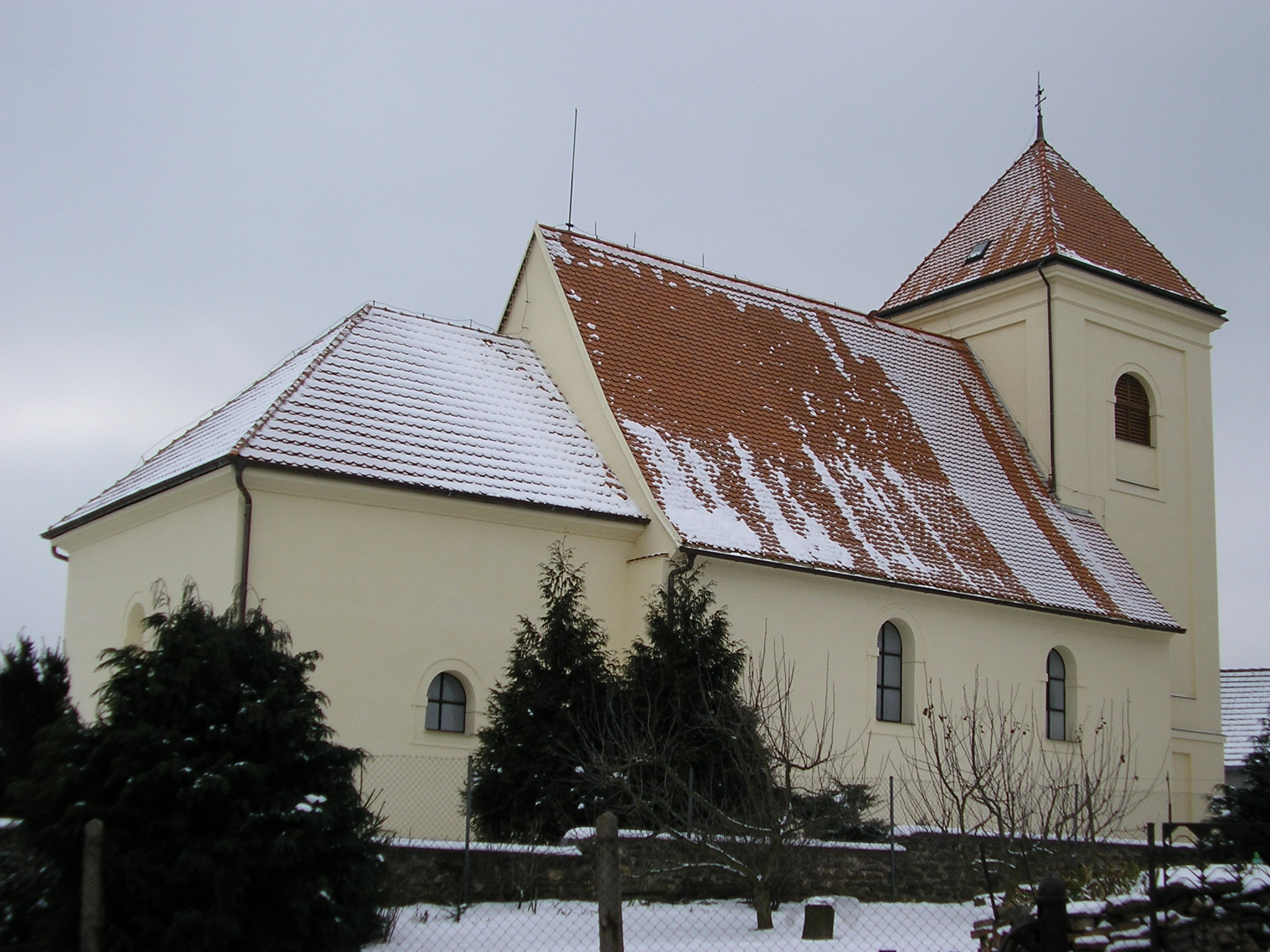
- Church of Saint Wenceslaus

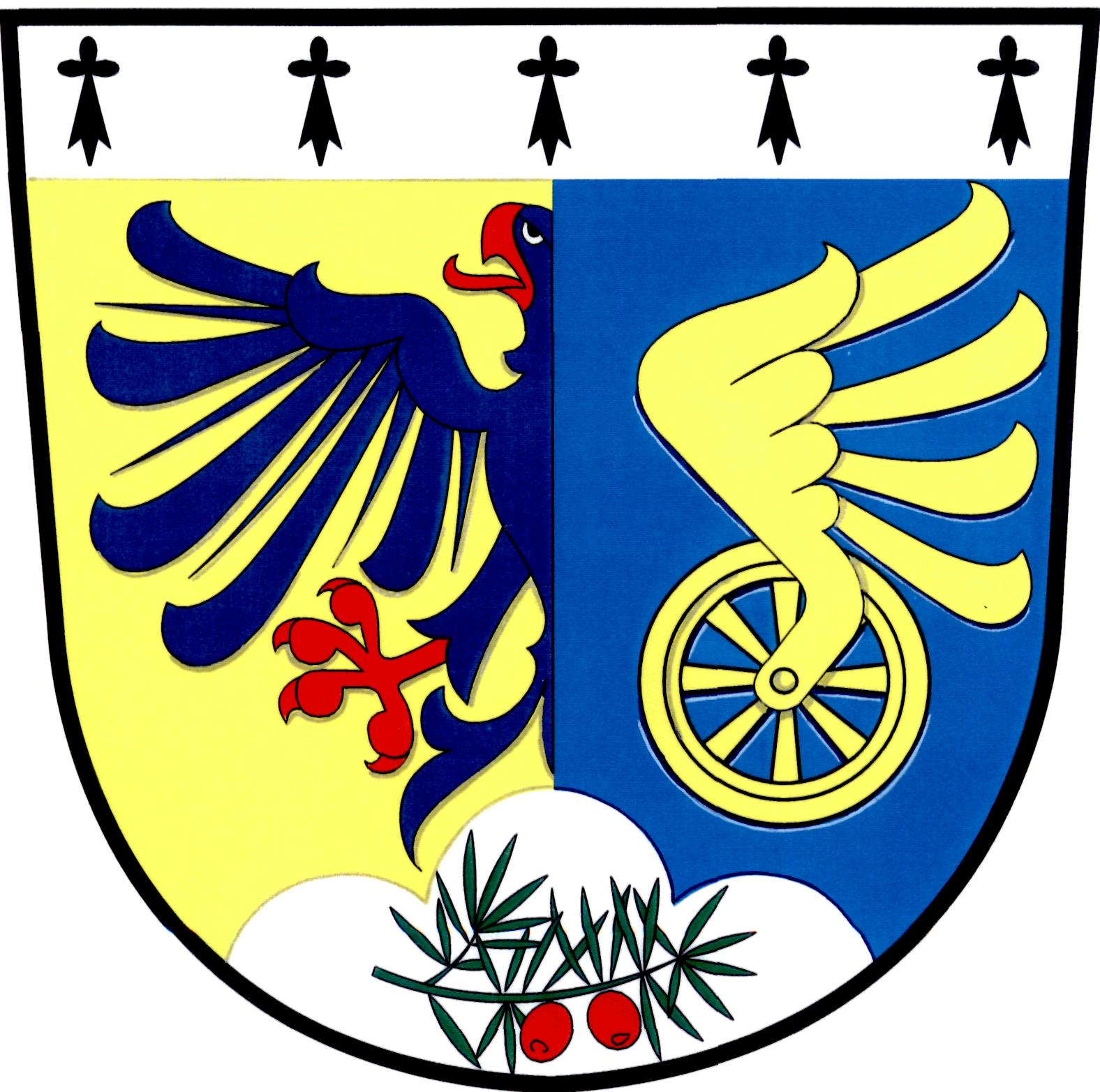
- Flag Coat of arms

- Location in the Czech Republic
- Coordinates: 49°51′19″N 15°25′50″E
- Country: Czech Republic
- Region: Central Bohemian
- District: Kutná Hora
- First mentioned: 1126

Area
  - Total: 8.27 km^{2} (3.19 sq mi)
- Elevation: 318 m (1,043 ft)

Population (2026-01-01)
  - Total: 431
  - Density: 52.1/km^{2} (135/sq mi)
- Time zone: UTC+1 (CET)
  - Summer (DST): UTC+2 (CEST)
- Postal code: 286 01
- Website: www.bratcice.cz

Bratčice (German: Bratschitz) is a municipality and village in Kutná Hora District in the Central Bohemian Region of the Czech Republic. It has about 400 inhabitants.

== Demographics ==
Historical population
Year	Pop.	±%
1869	751	—
1880	761	+1.3%
1890	746	−2.0%
1900	761	+2.0%
1910	743	−2.4%
1921	704	−5.2%
1930	651	−7.5%
1950	601	−7.7%
1961	565	−6.0%
1970	498	−11.9%
1980	462	−7.2%
1991	417	−9.7%
2001	392	−6.0%
2011	398	+1.5%
2021	383	−3.8%
Source: Censuses

== Notable people ==
- Jan Perner (1815–1845), railway engineer
