= Bratčice (Brno-Country District) =

- Municipality
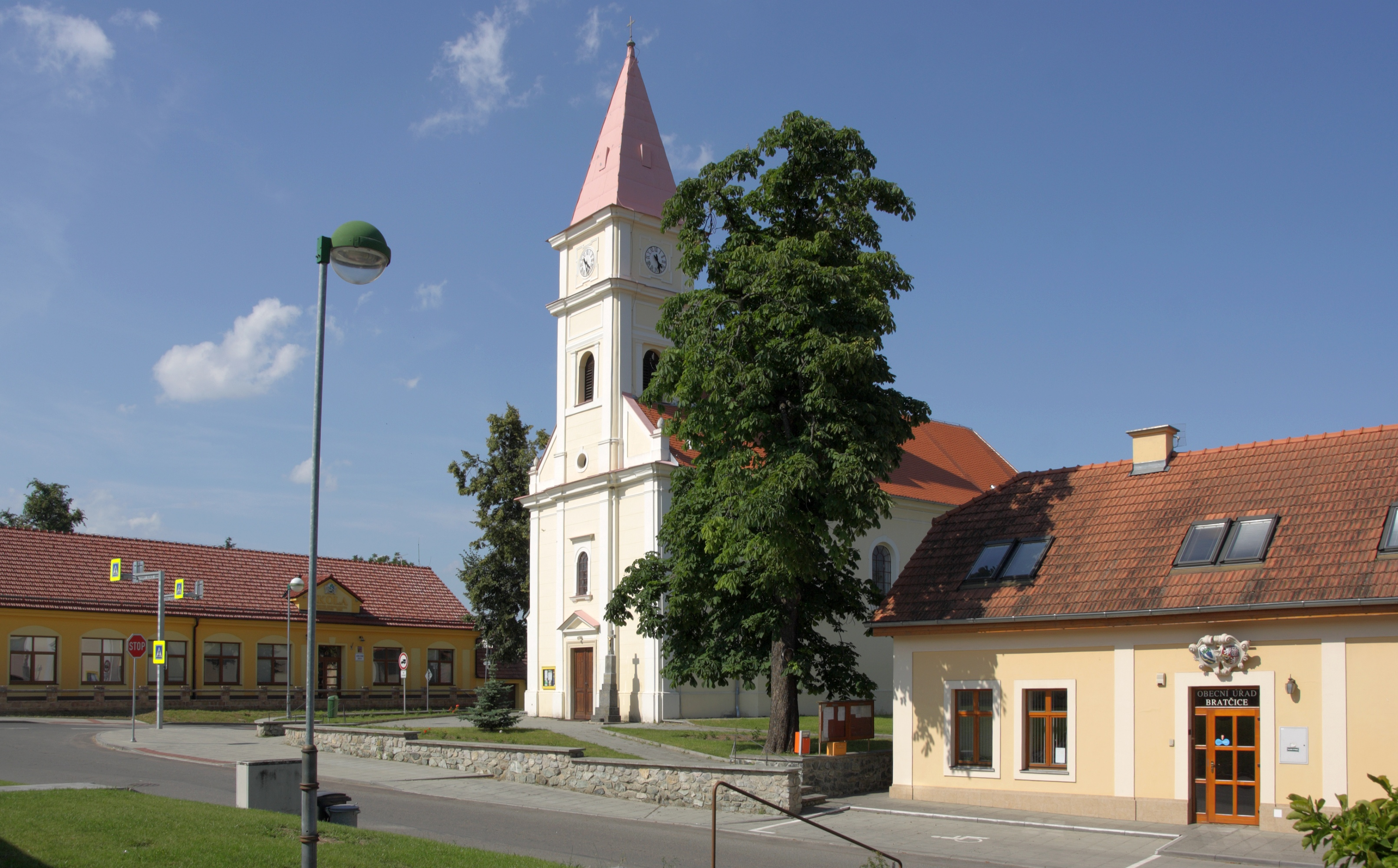
- Centre of Bratčice with the Church of the Holy Trinity

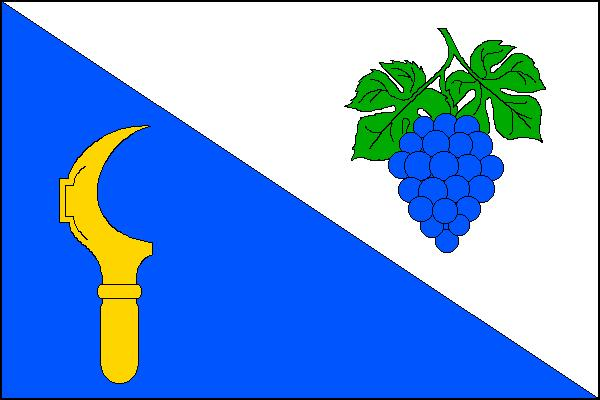
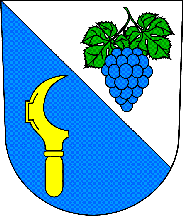
- Flag Coat of arms

- Location in the Czech Republic
- Coordinates: 49°3′55″N 16°31′23″E
- Country: Czech Republic
- Region: South Moravian
- District: Brno-Country
- First mentioned: 1537

Area
  - Total: 6.17 km^{2} (2.38 sq mi)
- Elevation: 215 m (705 ft)

Population (2026-01-01)
  - Total: 681
  - Density: 110/km^{2} (286/sq mi)
- Time zone: UTC+1 (CET)
  - Summer (DST): UTC+2 (CEST)
- Postal code: 664 67
- Website: www.obecbratcice.cz

Bratčice is a municipality and village in Brno-Country District in the South Moravian Region of the Czech Republic. It has about 700 inhabitants.

Bratčice lies approximately 17 kilometres (11 mi) south-west of Brno and 190 km (120 mi) south-east of Prague.

== Demographics ==
Historical population
Year	Pop.	±%
1869	568	—
1880	657	+15.7%
1890	739	+12.5%
1900	748	+1.2%
1910	762	+1.9%
1921	779	+2.2%
1930	850	+9.1%
1950	850	+0.0%
1961	851	+0.1%
1970	797	−6.3%
1980	711	−10.8%
1991	622	−12.5%
2001	632	+1.6%
2011	686	+8.5%
2021	677	−1.3%
Source: Censuses
