= University of Pardubice =

University in the Czech Republic

- Univerzita Pardubice
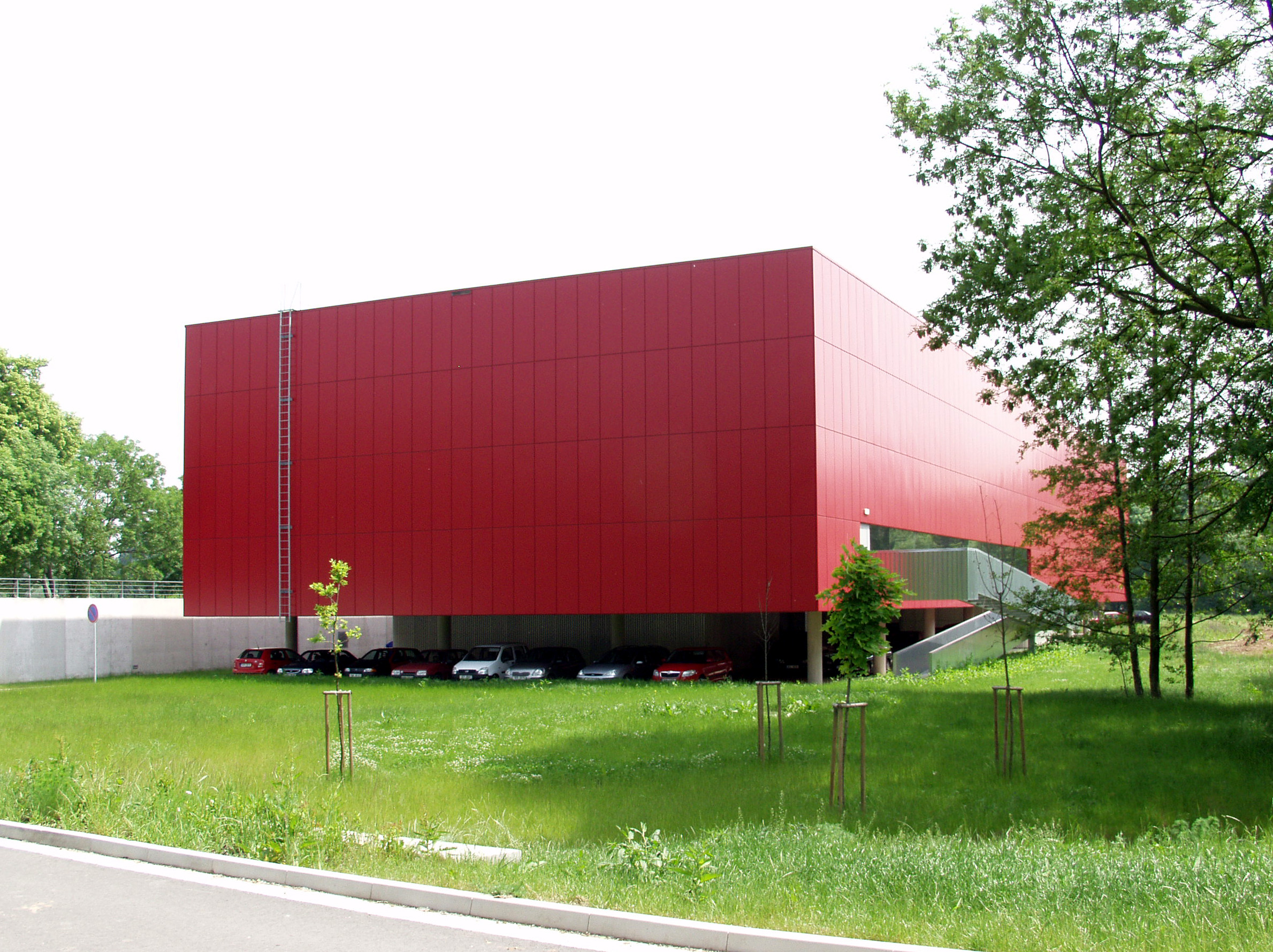
- Type: Public
- Established: 1950
- Affiliations: EUA
- Rector: Libor Čapek
- Administrative staff: 622
- Students: 8000
- Doctoral students: 484
- Location: Pardubice, Czech Republic; 50°2′53.31″N 15°46′9.86″E
- Website: http://www.upce.cz/en/

University rankings

Regional – Overall
- QS Emerging Europe and Central Asia: 143 (2022)

University of Pardubice (Czech: Univerzita Pardubice or UPA) is a university in Pardubice, the Czech Republic. In 2021 it had nearly 8,000 students. It is the only university in Pardubice Region.

== History ==
In the aftermath of the World War II, chemical factories in the city asked for the establishment of a specialised university in their vicinity. The university was started under the name of Vysoká škola chemická (Chemical Institute) in 1950, and renamed to Vysoká škola chemicko-technologická (Institute of Chemical Technology) in 1954. Since 1990, new faculties have been added, and in 1994 the institution was renamed to University of Pardubice.

== Faculties ==
- Jan Perner Transportat Faculty (Dopravní fakulta Jana Pernera, DF JP, est. 1992)
- Faculty of Economics And Administration (Fakulta ekonomicko-správní Pardubice, FES, est. 1991)
- Faculty of Arts and Philosophy (Fakulta filozofická, formerly Fakulta humanitních studií, est. 1992)
- Faculty of Chemical Technology (Fakulta chemicko-technologická, FChT, est. 1950)
- Faculty of Art Restoration (Fakulta restaurování in Litomyšl, FR, est. 2005)
- Faculty of Electrical Engineering and Informatics (Fakulta elektrotechniky a informatiky, FEI, est. 2002)
- Faculty of Health Studies (Fakulta zdravotnických studií, FZS, est. 2002)
