= XV International AIDS Conference, 2004 =

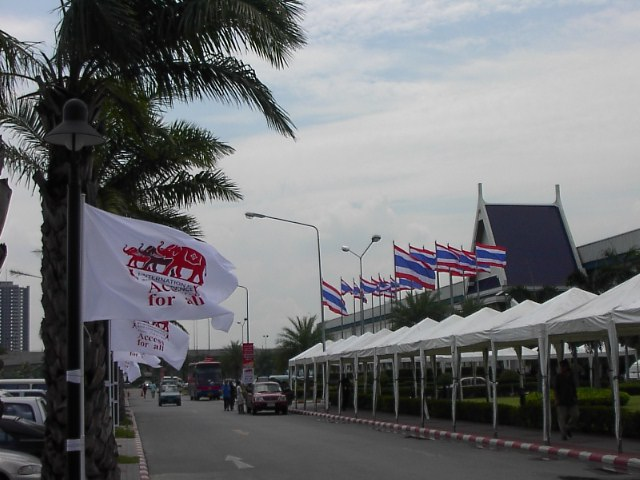
The IMPACT Muang Thong Thani convention centre, Bangkok, venue for the XV International AIDS Conference

The XV International AIDS Conference was held in Bangkok, the capital city of Thailand, from July 11 to July 16, 2004. The main venue for the conference was the IMPACT Muang Thong Thani convention centre at Nonthaburi, north-east of downtown Bangkok. It was the first international AIDS conference to be held in Southeast Asia. International AIDS conferences have been held regularly since the first one in Atlanta in 1985. The conference's theme was "Access for All".

At the opening ceremony on the evening of July 11, the main speakers were the Thai Prime Minister, Thaksin Shinawatra, and the Secretary-General of the United Nations, Kofi Annan. The opening was screened live on Thai national television.

Thaksin, whose government had been criticised by foreign observers for its harsh attitude to injecting drug users, surprised the conference by pledging to adopt a "harm minimization" approach to AIDS prevention among drug users, and to work co-operatively with non-government organizations, including the Thai Drug Users' Network. AIDS activists suggested that Thaksin had been promised greatly increased funding from the Global Fund to Fight AIDS, Tuberculosis and Malaria if he adopted a more flexible attitude.

Annan, in a forceful speech, praised Thaksin and also the President of Uganda, Yoweri Museveni, who was seated in the front row, for their leadership in developing strategies for fighting AIDS in developing countries. But he said that much more was needed, including a radical change in attitudes to women in many countries, since HIV infection is now increasing more rapidly among young women in developing countries that in any other population group. Annan said the empowerment of women, particularly in African and Asian countries, was the key to preventing the further spread of HIV infection.

The conference was attended by around 15,000-17,000 delegates from 160 countries and a large contingent of local and international media. Many people with HIV/AIDS and delegates from developing countries were subsidized to attend the conference by governments, the United Nations, other international organizations and drug companies.

The United States, however, significantly reduced its official presence at the conference as compared to previous conferences. The Department of Health and Human Services, which spent US$3.6 million to send 236 people to the XIV International AIDS Conference in Barcelona in 2002, spent US$500,000 and sent only 50. The move was seen as a response to events in Barcelona, when Health and Human Services Secretary Tommy Thompson was shouted down by protestors.

The co-chairs of the conference were Dr. Vallop Thaineua of Thailand and Joep Lange of the Netherlands, president of the International AIDS Society, which was the formal host organization. The content of the conference was run by three program committees, the Community Program Committee, chaired by Senator Mechai Viravaidya and Donald De Gagne, the Scientific Program Committee chaired by Professor Prasert Thongcharoen and Professor David Cooper, and the Leadership Program Committee chaired by Pakdee Pothisiri and Debrework Zewdie.

The Leadership Program section of the Conference was, however, thrown into doubt by security concerns. On July 7, the Thai government cancelled a meeting on HIV/AIDS for national leaders planned as part of the conference. The leaders of 13 countries and United Nations Secretary-General Kofi Annan were invited to the summit, which was to be hosted by Thai Prime Minister Thaksin Shinawatra, but only one national leader and Annan accepted.

As at previous international AIDS conferences, both local and international organizations staged protests about various aspects of HIV/AIDS policy at the Bangkok conference. Activists protested during the opening of the conference to call attention to what they said were failures by governments worldwide in fighting AIDS. Tight security prevented any disruption to the ceremony, although Prime Minister Thaksin was heckled during his speech by some sections of the audience.

The protests were co-ordinated by Thailand's AIDS Access Foundation. They called for increased worldwide access to antiretroviral treatments and greater financial support for treatment and prevention. Activists said that the United States and other Western nations were backtracking on funding pledges made at the Barcelona conference.

== Conference organisation ==
The XV International AIDS Conference is organised by the International AIDS Society (IAS) and the Thai Ministry of Public Health as the local Host. The co-organisers of the conference are UNAIDS, three international community networks: ICW, ICASO, GNP+ and TNCA, a conglomerate of Thai AIDS NGOs.

Starting with Bangkok, the IAS established a central conference secretariat to organise the International AIDS Conferences as well as the HIV Pathogenesis and Treatment Conferences. The Local Host Secretariat is located in Bangkok to coordinate the work of local subcommittees. The Community Program Secretariat is located in Bangkok to handle capacity building, outreach and the community aspects of the program.

Representatives from the organisers and co-organisers form the basis of the Conference Organising Committee (COC). The Chairs of the conference represent the IAS and the Local Host. The COC in turn appoints two chairs each for the Scientific Program Committee (SPC), Community Program Committee (CPC) and Leadership Program Committee. The Committee Chairs serve on the COC. The SPC, CPC and LPC are then composed of leading representatives from a variety of fields who bring a diverse expertise to the conference planning process.

== Jonathan Mann Memorial Lecture ==
On the third day of the conference Professor Dennis Altman of Melbourne, a leading figure in the arena of international HIV/AIDS politics since the 1980s, delivered the Jonathan Mann Memorial Lecture. His theme was "structural interventions and vulnerable communities," particularly men who have sex with men, injecting drug users and sex workers. But he was not confined by this topic. He said of the late Professor Jonathan Mann, in whose honour the lecture is named: "One of the things I liked about Jonathan was his willingness to offend when doing so would confront people with the consequences of their actions."

Altman pointed out that the tendency to blame rich countries and pharmaceutical companies for the failure to stem the rising tide of AIDS ignored that the fact that "even poor countries can afford to support good prevention efforts, as Uganda and Cambodia remind us." More to blame, he said, was the failure of governments and religious leaderships to face up to the practices that facilitated the spread of HIV.

"The greatest tragedy of HIV/AIDS is that we know how to stop its spread, and yet in most parts of the world we are failing to do so," Altman said. He cited what he called the deliberate neglect by governments, the unwillingness to speak openly of HIV and its risks, and the "hypocrisy with which simple measures of prevention are forestalled in the name of culture, religion and tradition," as the major reasons for the continued spread of the epidemic.

Altman was particularly critical of the failure to remember the lessons learned by the gay male community during the first decade of the AIDS epidemic, particularly the need for affected communities to be at the centre of the response to AIDS. He called for an end to restrictions on the discussion and promotion of condoms, and an end to silence about homosexuality, sex work and drug use in many countries.

"As the epidemic grows we have many reasons to be angry, particularly at the hypocrisies of most governments and most religious leaders," Altman concluded. "We ignore the ways in which fundamentalists of all faiths perpetuate the gender and sexual inequalities that fuel the epidemic. But anger that is not supported by analysis, and that does not lead to action, is wasted and self-indulgent."
