= Debrework Zewdie =

Nigerian immunologist, Public Health Researcher, professor

- ደብረወርቅ ዘውዴ
- Born: Harar, Ethiopia
- Education: University of London, London, United Kingdom; St. Mary’s Hospital Medical School, Department of Experimental Pathology, London, United Kingdom; Addis Ababa University, Addis Ababa, Ethiopia
- Occupations: Immunologist, Public Health Researcher, professor, global health leader
- Writing career
- Period: 20th and 21st centuries
- Genres: Immunology, public health, infectious disease, emergent diseases, Epidemiology, HIV/AIDS
- Subjects: Immunology, AIDS, public health, tuberculosis
- Movements: Global health, infectious disease, women's health, feminism, Immunology, Public health science,

Debrework Zewdie (Amharic: ደብረወርቅ ዘውዴ), is an Ethiopian immunologist, known for her role in shaping international response to the HIV/AIDS epidemic and her leadership positions at the World Bank and the Global Fund to Fight AIDS, Tuberculosis and Malaria. She holds a Ph.D. in Clinical Immunology from the University of London and was a Senior MacArthur Fellow at the Harvard Center for Population and Development Studies as well as a Richard L. and Ronay A. Menschel Senior Leadership Fellow at the Harvard T.H. Chan School of Public Health in 2015. During her Fellowship at the Harvard Chan School, she also participated as a speaker on Voices in Leadership, an original webcast series, in a discussion titled, "Leadership in Getting AIDS on the World Bank Agenda", moderated by Dr. Barry Bloom.

She is an advocate for women's health and was a founding vice president and member of the Society for Women and AIDS in Africa (SWAA) and a member of the Organisation for Women in Science for the Developing World (OWSD).

== Education ==
She earned a B.Sc in Biology from the Addis Ababa University and went on to complete a Ph.D in Clinical Immunology from the University of London in 1982. Zewdie did her postdoctoral fellowship research in Microbiology at SYVA, a diagnostics company in Palo Alto, California.

She was awarded a Senior MacArthur Fellowship at Harvard University and later participated as a Richard L. and Ronay A. Menschel Senior Leadership Fellow at Harvard T.H. Chan School of Public Health, Boston, MA, USA.

== Career ==
Debrework Zewdie established and headed the Referral Laboratory for HIV/AIDS in Addis Ababa and also served as Acting Director of the National Research Institute of Health, Ethiopia. She went on to become the Deputy Regional Director - Africa region for the AIDS Control and Prevention project (AIDSCAP) of Family Health International, Nairobi, Kenya prior to joining the World Bank in 1994.

She served as Director of the World Bank Global AIDS Program and Deputy Executive Director and COO of the Global Fund to Fight AIDS, Tuberculosis and Malaria, where she conceptualized and managed the groundbreaking US$1 billion Multi-country HIV/AIDS Program that expanded the AIDS funding landscape and pioneered the large-scale multi-sectorial response with direct financing to civil society and the private sector. Dr. Zewdie led the articulation of the World Bank's first global strategy on HIV/AIDS and the Global HIV/AIDS Program of Action. As a founding UNAIDS Global Coordinator, she has been instrumental in making the unique cooperative structure of the UNAIDS family a working reality, fostering strong inter-agency partnerships. She co-lead internal reforms and oversaw the day to day operations, strategy planning and accountability at the Global Fund.

In addition to her work in HIV/AIDS, she also served as Director of The Global Alliance for TB Drug Development (TB Alliance).

== Fellowships and recognition ==
- Senior MacArthur Fellow, Harvard Center for Population and Development Studies.
- Richard L. and Ronay A. Menschel Senior Leadership Fellow, Harvard T.H. Chan School of Public Health
- Speaker in the Voices of Leadership series at Harvard, discussing "Leadership in Getting AIDS on the World Bank Agenda"

== Selected publications ==
- Tamara Sonia Boender, Françoise Barré-Sinoussi, David Cooper, Eric Goosby, Catherine Hankins, Michiel Heidenrijk, Menno de Jong, Michel Kazatchkine, Fola Laoye, Michael Merson, Peter Reiss, Tobias F Rinke de Wit, Khama Rogo, Onno Schellekens, Constance Schultsz, Kim C E Sigaloff, John Simon, Debrework Zewdie. Research in action: from AIDS to global health to impact. A symposium in recognition of the scientific contributions of Professor Joep Lange. Antivir. Ther. (Lond.) Antivir Ther 2015 (March) 18;20(1):101-8. Epub 2015 Feb 18. Print March 2015. Amsterdam Institute for Global Health and Development and Department of Global Health, Academic Medical Center, University of Amsterdam, Amsterdam, the Netherlands. s.boender@aighd.org.
- Samuel Lieberman, Pablo Gottret, Ethan Yeh, Joy de Beyer, Robert Oelrichs, Debrework Zewdie. International health financing and the response to AIDS. J Acquir Immune Defic Syndr 2009(November);52(Suppl 1):S38-44. Global HIV/AIDS Program, World Bank, Washington, DC 20433, USA.
- Peter Piot, Michael Bartos, Heidi Larson, Debrework Zewdie, Purnima Mane. Coming to terms with complexity: a call to action for HIV prevention. Lancet 2008(September) 5;372(9641):845-59. Epub 2008 Aug 5. Print September 2008. Joint United Nations Programme on HIV/AIDS (UNAIDS), Geneva, Switzerland.
- Debrework Zewdie, Pedro Cahn, Craig McClure, Jacqueline Bataringaya. The role of HIV research in building health system capacity in developing countries. Curr Opin HIV AIDS 2008(July);3(4):481-8.Global HIV/AIDS Program of the World Bank Human Development Network, World Bank, Washington DC, USA.
- Debrework Zewdie, Kevin De Cock, Peter Piot. Sustaining treatment costs: who will pay? AIDS 2007(July);21(Suppl 4):S1-4. Global HIV/AIDS Program, The World Bank, 1818 H Street NW, Washington, DC 20010, USA. dzewdie@worldbank.org.
- Debrework Zewdie, Joep Marie Albert Lange, Daniel R. Kuritzkes. Rapid expansion of access to antiretroviral therapy (ART). AIDS 2004(June);18(Suppl 3):S1-3.
- Debrework Zewdie, Joep Marie Albert Lange, Jos Perriens, Daniel R. Kuritzkes. What policymakers should know about drug resistance and adherence in the context of scaling-up treatment of HIV infection. AIDS 2004(June);18(Suppl 3):S69-74. International AIDS Society and International Antiviral Therapy Evaluation Center, Academic Medical Center, University of Amsterdam, the Netherlands. j.lange@amc.uva.nl.
- Daniel R. Kuritzkes, Joep Marie Albert Lange, Debrework Zewdie. World Bank meeting concludes drug resistance should not prevent distribution of antiretroviral therapy to poor countries. Nat Med 2003;9(11):1343-4.
- Debrework Zewdie. Charging forward: leveraging a time of great momentum into concrete progress. 5th International Conference on Healthcare Resource Allocation for HIV/AIDS. April 15–17, 2002, Rio de Janeiro, Brazil. IAPAC Mon 2002(August);8(8):235-9. Global AIDS Campaign, World Bank, Washington, DC, USA.
- Peter Piot, Debrework Zewdie, Tomris Türmen. HIV/AIDS prevention and treatment. Lancet 2002(July);360(9326):86; author reply 87-8.

== See also ==
- AIDS
- Blood tests
- Development Alternatives Incorporated
- Drug tests
- Malaria
- PharmAccess Foundation
- Screening (medicine)
- Super-spreader
- Tuberculosis
