= RDI =

RDI may refer to:

== Organisations ==
- Ici RDI, formerly Réseau de l'information, a Canadian French language news channel owned by Radio-Canada
- Rassemblement démocratique pour l'indépendance, unofficial banner of dissident deputies of Parti Québécois in 1984–1985
- RDI Video Systems, a video game company
- Renew Democracy Initiative, an American political organization promoting and defending liberal democracy
- Resource Development International, Louisville, Kentucky organization that works on water, sanitation, education, and community development projects
- Response Dynamics, a conservative direct marketing firm
- Rural Development Institute, Canadian research center

== Science and technology ==
- Radar Doppler à Impulsions, air intercept radar on French Mirage 2000C fighters that was developed from the Radar Doppler Multifunction
- Reference Daily Intake or Recommended Daily Intake, a quantity of recommended nutrient intake
- Relationship Development Intervention, a treatment for autism
- Resistance Database Initiative, a not-for-profit HIV/AIDS research organisation
- Respiratory disturbance index, a tool for measuring frequency of breathing related sleep disturbances
- RDI register, a 64-bit processor register of x86 CPUs
- Reflected DOM Injection, an XSS technique

== Other ==
- Royal Designers for Industry, a British honour bestowed on leading designers by the Royal Society of Arts
