= AVCC =

AVCC may refer to:

- Antiviral Chemistry & Chemotherapy, a scientific journal
- Australian Vice-Chancellors' Committee
