= Antiviral (disambiguation) =

Antiviral may refer to:

- Antiviral (film), a 2012 body horror film by Brandon Cronenberg
- Antiviral drug, a class of medication used specifically for treating viral infections
- Antiviral protein, produced by cells to inhibit viral replication and spread
- Antivirus software, program designed to prevent, detect, and remove malware from computers
- Antiviral Therapy (journal), a peer-reviewed medical journal covering the clinical development of antiviral drugs and related topics
