= Susan Kippax =

Australian social psychologist

Susan Kippax AO FASSA
- Born: 1941 (age 84–85)
- Other name: Susan Caroline Kippax
- Occupation: Social psychologist
- Awards: Rhodes Travelling Fellowship, 1970

Academic background
- Education: University of Sydney
- Thesis: Attitudes: A theory and experimental investigation of their complex nature (1972)

Susan Caroline Kippax AO FASSA (born 1941) is an Australian social psychologist and is Emeritus Professor at the University of New South Wales.

== Academic career ==
Born in 1941, Kippax graduated from the University of Sydney with a BA (1968). In 1970 she won a Rhodes Travelling Fellowship to study at the University of Oxford. She completed her PhD (1972) at the University of Sydney. Her thesis was titled Attitudes: A theory and experimental investigation of their complex nature.

In 1973 Kippax joined the Department of Psychology at Macquarie University where she helped establish the National Centre in HIV Social Research (NCHIVSR) in 1995. In 1999 she and the NCHIVSR moved to the University of New South Wales. She was appointed Emeritus Professor in 2008.

In 1999 Kippax was one of four Founding Editors of Culture, Health & Sexuality, the journal of the International Association for the Study of Sexuality, Culture and Society. She was co-Editor-in-Chief of the Journal of the International Aids Society for ten years, retiring in July 2019.

== Honours and recognition ==
Kippax was elected Fellow of the Academy of the Social Sciences in Australia in 2000.

She was appointed an Officer of the Order of Australia in the 2019 Queen's Birthday Honours for "distinguished service to higher education, and to community health, particularly through research into HIV prevention and treatment".

== Selected works ==
=== Books ===
- Rosengarten, Marsha; Race, Kane; Kippax, Susan (2000), Touch wood, everything will be ok: Gay men's understandings of clinical markers in sexual practice, National Centre in HIV Social Research, ISBN 978-1-875978-40-3
- Southgate, Erica; Kippax, Susan; Owler, Kathryn (2002), Social research needs analysis: The Australian Intravenous League and the Australian Hepatitis Council and their member organisations, National Centre in HIV Social Research, University of New South Wales, ISBN 978-1-875978-53-3
- Smith, Gary; Worth, Heather; Kippax, Susan (2004), Sexual adventurism among Sydney gay men, University of New South Wales, National Centre in HIV Social Research, ISBN 978-1-875978-78-6
- Kippax, Susan; Stephenson, Niamh (2016), Socialising the biomedical turn in HIV prevention, Anthem Press, an imprint of Wimbledon Publishing Company, ISBN 978-1-78308-507-1

=== Articles ===
- Mark A. Wainberg; Kippax, Susan Caroline; Marlene Bras; Papa S. Sow (2014). "HIV and Ebola: similarities and differences". Journal of the International AIDS Society. 17 19896. doi:10.7448/ias.17.1.19896. PMC 4252165. PMID 25466882. Wikidata Q43050877.
- Wainberg, Mark Arnold; Kippax, Susan Caroline; Marlene Bras; Papa Salif Sow (2015). "Has the world ceased to care about HIV? And what can we do about it?". Journal of the International AIDS Society. 18 20818. doi:10.7448/ias.18.1.20818. PMC 4668283. PMID 26632480. Wikidata Q40884809.
- Kippax, Susan Caroline (2017). "A journey to HIV prevention research: From social psychology to social health via multidisciplinarity". Journal of Health Psychology. 23 (3): 442–456. doi:10.1177/1359105317707529. PMID 28810461. Wikidata Q38556936.
- Mayer, Kenneth; Kippax, Susan Caroline; Annette H Sohn; Marlène Bras (2018). "The importance of serostatus awareness in arresting the spread of HIV". Journal of the International AIDS Society. 21 (11) e25217. doi:10.1002/jia2.25217. PMC 6265236. PMID 30499224. Wikidata Q59800892.
