= XVI International AIDS Conference, 2006 =

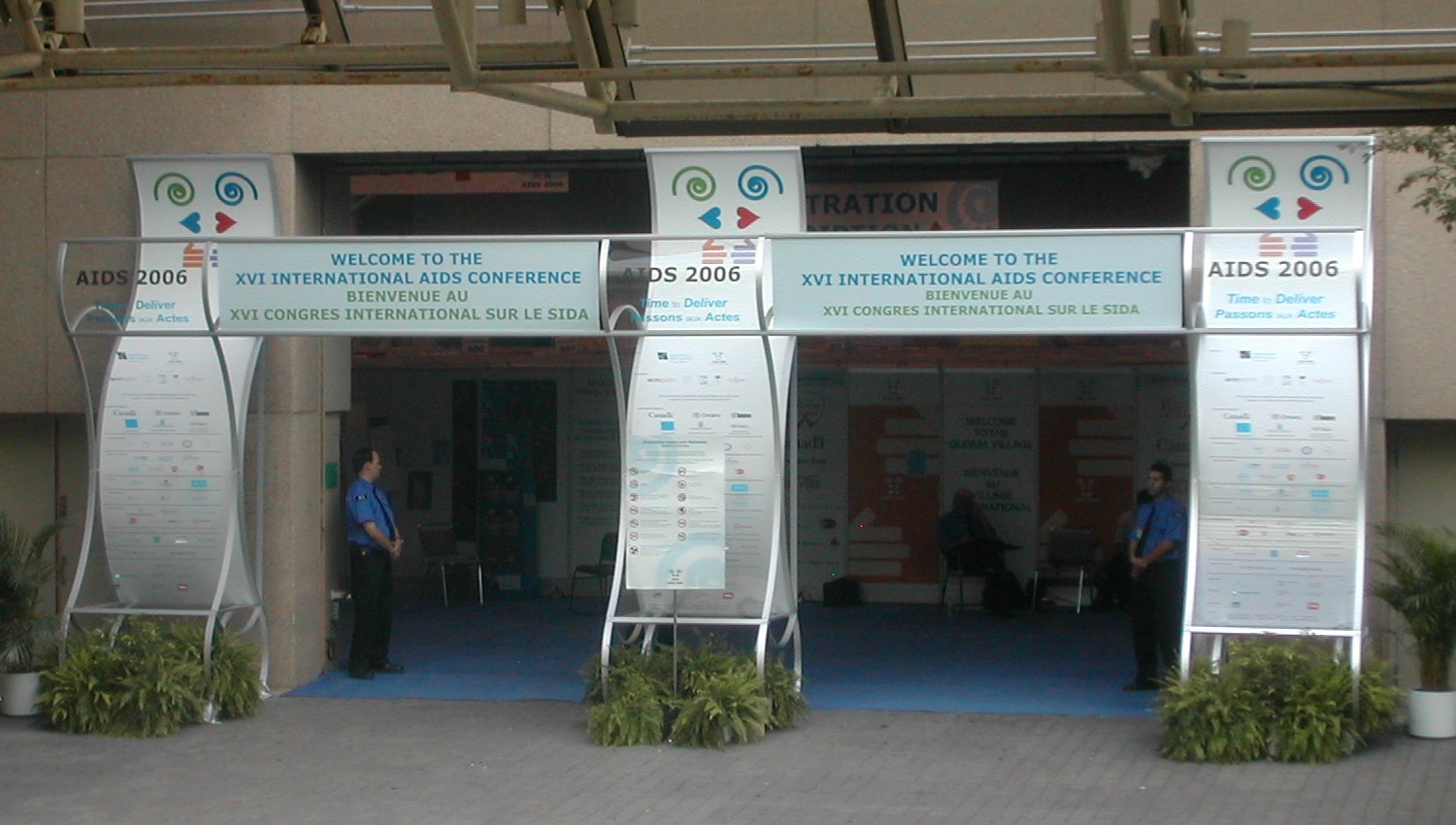
One of the entrances to the Metro Toronto Convention Centre during AIDS 2006

The XVI International AIDS Conference was held in Toronto, Ontario, during the week of 13–18 August 2006. This was the third time that Canada has hosted the International AIDS Conference, after Montreal in 1989 and Vancouver in 1996. The main venue for the conference was the Metro Toronto Convention Centre (MTCC) in downtown Toronto. The conference theme was Time to Deliver. The conference was focused on the promises and progress made to scale-up treatment, care and prevention.

In particular:

- Accelerating research to end the epidemic
- Expanding and sustaining human resources to scale-up treatment and prevention
- Intensifying the involvement of affected communities
- Building new leadership to advance the response

Activities included cultural, youth and outreach programmes as well as a Global Village, which served as an international gathering place with displays of culture, food, community, and a marketplace.

Events open to delegates and the public included The International AIDS Vigil, a public memorial to all those who have died of HIV/AIDS. The Vigil took place on at 9 pm on 17 August at Yonge-Dundas Square, Toronto.

Well-known attendees and speakers included Governor General Michaëlle Jean, Stephen Lewis (the United Nations special envoy for HIV/AIDS in Africa), Bill and Melinda Gates (for the Gates Foundation), Richard Gere, Alicia Keys, and Bill Clinton.

== Harper controversy ==
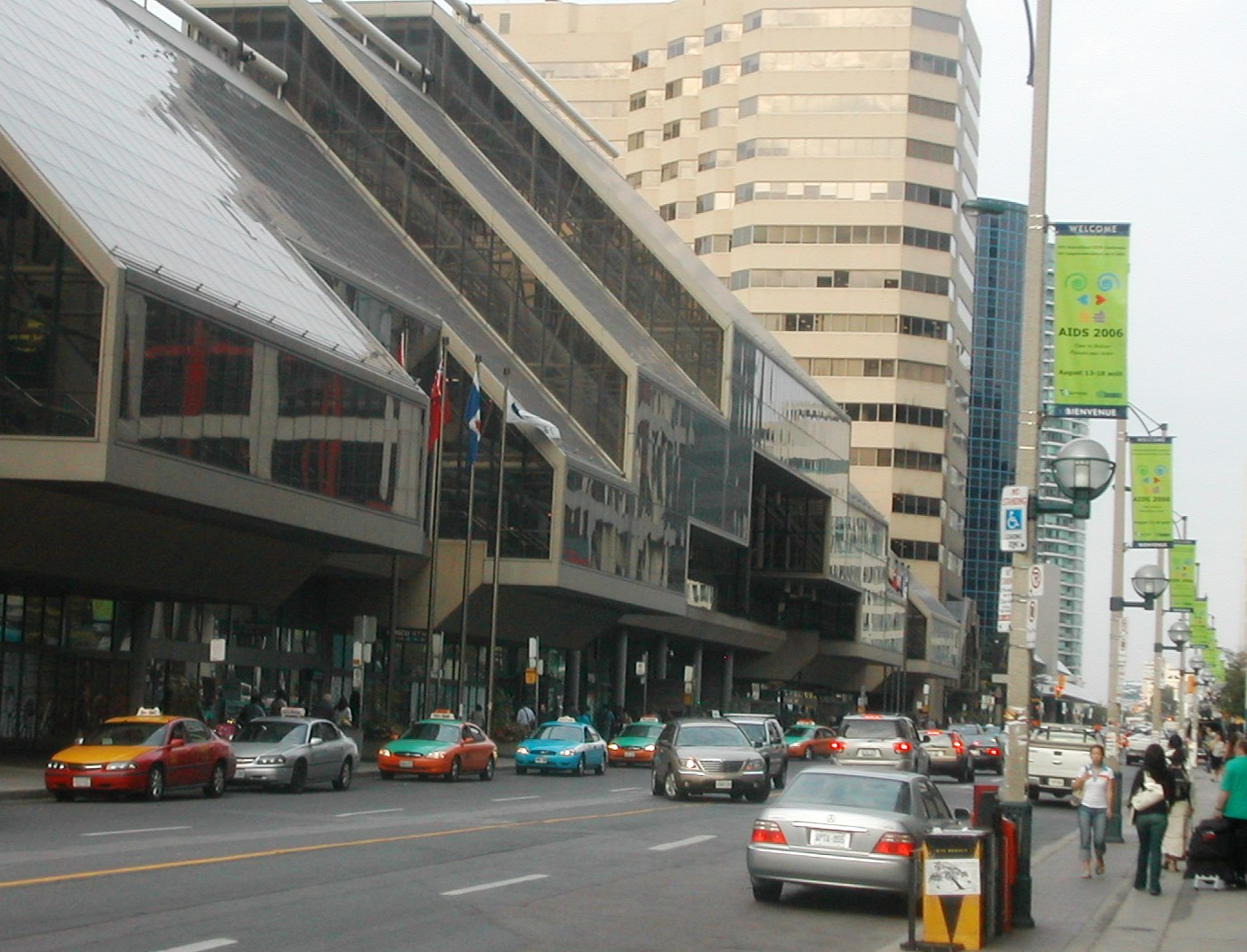
Banners of the AIDS 2006 conference could be found along many streets near the conference centre. Shown here is Front Street, just outside the conference centre.

Canadian Prime Minister Stephen Harper, who decided not to attend the conference, was criticized by Conference co-chairman Dr. Mark Wainberg in his speech, saying, "We are dismayed that the prime minister of Canada, Mr. Stephen Harper, is not here this evening...The role of prime minister includes the responsibility to show leadership on the world stage. Your absence sends the message that you do not consider HIV/AIDS as a critical priority, and clearly all of us here disagree with you". Canadian Minister of Health Tony Clement attended in Harper's place. Harper's absence from the conference is the second time the Canadian head of government has decided not to attend the conference. In 1996, former Prime Minister Jean Chrétien did not attend the conference.

== Asylum seekers controversy ==
A second controversy, that followed Stephen Harper's choice to not attend, was that 151 delegates who were in attendance refused to return to their home countries – instead opting to seek asylum in Canada. This development seriously hurt the credibility of the conference and many suggested that the Prime Minister's office may have been justified in its decision to not have Harper in attendance.

== See also ==
- XV International AIDS Conference, 2004 in Bangkok, Thailand
