= JIAS =

JIAS may refer to:

• Joint Interim Administrative Structure

• Journal of the International AIDS Society
