= Mark Wainberg =

Canadian AIDS researcher

- Born: April 21, 1945; Montreal, Quebec
- Died: April 11, 2017 (aged 71); Miami-Dade County, Florida
- Resting place: Baron de Hirsch Cemetery, Montreal
- Citizenship: Canadian
- Education: McGill University; Columbia University
- Spouse: Susan Hubschman
- Children: Dr. Zev Wainberg, Jonathan Wainberg
- Awards: OC, OQ
- Scientific career
- Fields: AIDS research

Mark Arnold Wainberg, OC OQ FRSC (21 April 1945 – 11 April 2017) was a Canadian HIV/AIDS researcher and HIV/AIDS activist. He was the director of the McGill University AIDS Centre at the Montreal Jewish General Hospital and Professor of Medicine and of Microbiology at McGill University. His laboratory primarily studies HIV reverse transcriptase, the molecular basis for drug resistance, and gene therapy. He received a B.Sc. from McGill University in 1966, a Ph.D. from Columbia University in 1972, and did his post-doctoral research at Hadassah Medical School of the Hebrew University.

== Accomplishments and honors ==
Wainberg and his collaborators were the first to identify the antiviral capabilities of 3TC in 1989 and test the drug in patients. 3TC is also called lamivudine.

From 1998 to 2000, Wainberg was President of the International AIDS Society. He was Co-Chair of the XVI International AIDS Conference and a past president of the Canadian Association for HIV Research. Wainberg founded the Journal of the International AIDS Society in 2004, which he was still supporting as one of its three Editors-in-Chief. He was also an editor on publications including the Journal of Human Virology, Retrovirology, Journal of Leukocyte Biology, International Antiviral News, AIDS Patient Care and STDs, Brazilian Journal of Infectious Diseases and AIDS Research and Human Retroviruses.

In 2001, he was made an Officer of the Order of Canada, Canada's highest civilian honour, for his "major contributions to the study and treatment of" HIV/AIDS. In 2005, he was made an Officer of the National Order of Quebec, an order of merit bestowed by the government of the Province of Quebec. In 2000, he was made a Fellow of the Royal Society of Canada. In 2008, Wainberg was named a Chevalier de Légion d'honneur, the highest honor given by the country of France. In 2014, he was awarded the John G. Fitzgerald - CACMID Outstanding Microbiologist Award, which recognized him as "an individual who is outstanding in all aspects [and]... place him in a similar category to that of the individual the award is named after, Dr. John G. FitzGerald." In 2016, he was inducted into the Canadian Medical Hall of Fame for his contributions to HIV/AIDS research.

Wainberg was also a past president of Congregation Tifereth Beth David Jerusalem.

On September 30, 2024 McGill University and the Montreal Jewish General Hospital established the Mark Wainberg Centre for Viral Diseases at McGill University in memory of the pioneering medical researcher.

== AIDS advocacy ==
Dr. Wainberg advocated giving AIDS-related relief to developing countries. He was critical of politicians who ignore the problem of AIDS, including former South African President Thabo Mbeki. Dr. Wainberg also opposed the pseudoscientific ideas of AIDS denialism that are responsible for an estimated 330,000 AIDS deaths in South Africa alone.

In 2006, Dr. Wainberg was the Co-Chair of the XVI International AIDS Conference. In 2004, he was videotaped by AIDS denialist Robin Scovill, whose HIV-positive wife died in 2008 and whose daughter died of untested and untreated AIDS in 2005. In this interview, Dr. Wainberg proposed that those who harm others by publicly questioning HIV as the cause of AIDS should be charged with endangerment of public health and jailed if convicted of crime.

== Death ==
Mark Wainberg drowned while on a vacation in Florida. Some believe he had an asthma attack in the water, while others believe the undertow dragged him out. His funeral was held on Friday, April 14, 2017, in Congregation Tifereth Beth David Jerusalem, the Montreal synagogue where he had previously served as president.
