= Culture, Health & Sexuality =

- Discipline: Multidisciplinary sexology
- Language: English
- Edited by: Peter Aggleton

Publication details
- History: 1999–present
- Publisher: Routledge, Taylor & Francis (United Kingdom)
- Frequency: Quarterly

Standard abbreviations
- ISO 4: Cult. Health Sex.

Indexing
- ISSN: 1369-1058 (print); 1464-5351 (web)
- OCLC no.: 41546256

Links
- Journal homepage

Culture, Health & Sexuality is a peer-reviewed, multidisciplinary academic journal that publishes multidisciplinary articles analyzing the relationship between sexuality, culture, and health; health beliefs and systems; social structures and divisions, and the implications of these for sexual health and individual, collective, and community wellbeing. First published in 1999, it is the official journal of the International Association for the Study of Sexuality, Culture and Society. The editor-in-chief of Culture, Health & Sexuality is Peter Aggleton.

The journal was founded by Susan Kippax (University of New South Wales, Australia), Purnima Mane (UNFPA, New York, US), Richard Parker (Mailman School of Public Health, Columbia University, New York, US), and Barbara de Zalduondo.
