= XIV International AIDS Conference, 2002 =

AIDS Conference held in Barcelona, Spain

The XIV International AIDS Conference was held in Barcelona, Spain from July 7–12, 2002.

== Conference theme ==
The XIV International AIDS Conference was organized in Barcelona (Catalonia) in July 2002 by Dr. Jordi Casabona (medical epidemiologist) and Dr. Jose´Mª Garell (infectious disease medical specialist), the co-chairs of the conference, who created the Fundació Barcelona SIDA 2002 as the legal entity who supported the organization (currently Fundació Barcelona SIDA 2002 and Fundació Sida i Societat.) The theme of the conference was "Knowledge and Commitment for Action." The International AIDS Society selected this theme to emphasize the need for the general community and public and private sector organizations, scientists, and social workers to commit to use the knowledge gained through science and experience take action. The conference was attended by 18,000 people, and both former United States President Bill Clinton and former South African President Nelson Mandela participated in the closing ceremony.
