= Douglas Richman =

Douglas D. Richman
- Born: February 15, 1943 (age 83); New York, NY, USA
- Known for: HIV resistance, HIV latency
- Scientific career
- Fields: Virology
- Workplaces: University of California, San Diego Veterans Affairs San Diego Health System

Douglas D. Richman (born 15 February 1943, New York, NY) is an American infectious diseases physician and medical virologist. Richman's work has focused on the HIV/AIDS pandemic, since its appearance in the early 1980s. His major contributions have been in the areas of treatment, drug resistance, and pathogenicity.

== Career ==
Richman received his AB degree from Dartmouth College in 1965 and his MD degree from Stanford University in 1970. After further training in the U.S. Public Health Service at the National Institute of Allergy and Infectious Diseases, and Harvard Medical School in Infectious Diseases, he joined the University of California, San Diego (UCSD) in 1976, ultimately becoming Distinguished Professor of Pathology and Medicine, director of the Center for AIDS Research, director of the HIV Institute and the Florence Seeley Riford Chair in AIDS Research.

He also held positions at the Veterans Affairs San Diego Health System, where he conducted his clinical care and teaching. In 2019, he transitioned to emeritus Active status, in which he maintains his laboratory research and maintains his active leadership role in the Center for AIDS Research and the HIV Institute.

== Research ==
Dr. Richman conducted research on influenza virus, herpesviruses and hemorrhagic fever viruses before focusing on HIV in the 1980s. HIV drug resistance was originally recognized in his laboratory. In addition to his continuing interest in HIV treatment and drug resistance, his research interests have focused on HIV pathogenesis including the issues of viral latency and evolution.

Dr. Richman has made major clinical and laboratory contributions to the field of HIV/AIDS, which represent a model of translational medical research. He helped design and conduct the clinical evaluation of new drugs and treatment strategies, including the first trial of combination antiretroviral therapy and the initial study documenting the value of the strategy of rendering HIV RNA undetectable.

Two areas of his laboratory investigations represent landmark studies in HIV research. He was one of the group of researchers who first demonstrated HIV drug resistance in 1989. This was the scientific foundation for the development of combination antiretroviral therapies. Subsequent studies documented the impact of drug resistance on treatment failure, the presence of mixtures of different viral phenotypes and genotypes circulating in the same patient, the pre-existence of drug-resistant mutants in untreated patients, the impact of disease stage and viral replication on the rates of viral evolution, and the independent evolution of different populations of HIV in lymphoid tissues and the brain. These studies have had a broad impact on the development, evaluation and regulatory approval of drugs, and helped to establish the importance of drug resistance assays in the day-to-day management of infected patients.

In 1997, his laboratory was also among the first to demonstrate HIV latency and documented the existence of reservoirs of latently infected CD4 cells in patients who appeared to be "fully suppressed" on potent antiretroviral therapy. These observations have raised fundamental questions about T lymphocyte biology and viral replication that bridge to a basic understanding of viral pathogenesis. His laboratory elucidated the remarkable evolution of neutralizing antibody responses in HIV infection, providing important insights for the development of an effective HIV vaccine.

Dr. Richman's research activities focus on the latent HIV reservoir and efforts to eradicate it. He serves as a speaker on both basic and clinical subjects, an editor of a major textbook on clinical virology, organizer of international meetings and chair of national and international committees.

== Awards, editorships and advisory positions ==
Awards include the Howard M. Temin Award (1993), John Simon Guggenheim Fellowship (1984), Steve Chase Humanitarian Award for Science and Medicine of the Desert AIDS Project (2001), United States Department of Veterans Affairs William S. Middleton Award (2002), and the Gertrude B. Elion Memorial Award of the International Society for Antiviral Research (2016). He has been named Docteur en Medecin, Honoris Causa, University of Lausanne (2010), as well as holding numerous visiting professorships and honorary lectureships.

Richman is one of the founding editors of the academic journal Antiviral Therapy, a co-founder and member of the board of directors of the International Antiviral (formerly AIDS) Society-USA (IAS-USA), and editor-in-chief of Topics in Antiviral Medicine, as well as having served on the editorial board of 15 journals. He is a member of the board of directors of the human vaccine program. He has published over 730 papers and edited several books.

In 2022, Research.com recognized Dr. Richman as one of the world's best scientists, and in 2023, the same organization ranked him #40 in the world for immunology and #29 in the United States.
