= Antiviral Chemistry & Chemotherapy =

- Discipline: Antiviral drugs
- Language: English

Publication details
- History: 1990–present
- Publisher: International Medical Press
- Frequency: Bimonthly
- Open access: Delayed, after 12 months

Standard abbreviations
- ISO 4: Antivir. Chem. Chemother.

Indexing
- CODEN: ACCHEH
- ISSN: 0956-3202
- OCLC no.: 20073994

Links
- Journal homepage; Online access

Antiviral Chemistry & Chemotherapy is a peer-reviewed academic journal published bimonthly by International Medical Press. It was established in January 1990 and published by Blackwell Publishing until 1997. The editor-in-chief is Hugh J. Field (University of Cambridge). The journal covers research on all aspects of the preclinical development of antiviral drugs, including their chemical synthesis, biochemistry, pharmacology, mode of action, and virology, as well as studies in animal models. The journal is an official publication of the International Society for Antiviral Research.

== Abstracting and indexing ==
The journal is abstracted and indexed in:

- BIOSIS Previews
- CAB Abstracts
- Excerpta Medica/EMBASE
- EMBASE
- Chemical Abstracts
- Research Alert

== See also ==
- Antiviral Therapy
