= International Medical Press =

International Medical Press is a small medical publishing company, based in London. It also has offices in Atlanta and the Asia-Pacific region. International Medical Press is currently part of The Nucleus Group. The company was founded in 1996.

== Publications ==
International Medical Press publishes two peer-reviewed medical journals in antiviral research:

- Antiviral Therapy
- Antiviral Chemistry & Chemotherapy

The contents of both journals are freely available online as PDFs after 12 months (and at publication for individuals in developing countries), via the journal websites.

International Medical Press also runs conferences and publishes books, mainly in the virology area, including the Human Virus Guides series. It formerly published the monthly newsletter International Antiviral News (ISSN 0965-2310).
