= Antiviral Therapy (journal) =

- Discipline: Antiviral drugs
- Language: English

Publication details
- History: 1996–present
- Publisher: International Medical Press
- Frequency: 8/year
- Open access: Delayed, after 12 months
- Impact factor: 3.02 (2014)

Standard abbreviations
- ISO 4: Antivir. Ther.

Indexing
- CODEN: ANTHFA
- ISSN: 1359-6535
- OCLC no.: 67723439

Links
- Journal homepage; Online access

Antiviral Therapy is a peer-reviewed medical journal published by International Medical Press. It publishes primary papers and reviews on all aspects of the clinical development of antiviral drugs, including clinical trial results, drug resistance, viral diagnostics, drug safety, pharmacoepidemiology, and vaccines. Antiviral Therapy is an official publication of the International Society for Antiviral Research.

The journal was established in 1996 by Douglas D. Richman (University of California, San Diego) and Joep M.A. Lange (University of Amsterdam), who still as of 2013 serve as the joint editors-in-chief. The first two issues were published by MediTech Media. The initial publication frequency was quarterly, rising to bimonthly in 2003 and to eight issues a year in 2005. The journal also publishes supplements containing abstracts from various conferences and workshops, including the International HIV Drug Resistance Workshop, International Workshop on Adverse Drug Reactions and Lipodystrophy in HIV, and the Therapies for Viral Hepatitis Workshop.

Articles from 1998 are archived online in PDF format, with content over a year old being available for free. All online content is available free to those living in developing countries through HINARI.

== Abstracting and indexing ==
The journal is abstracted and indexed by BIOSIS Previews, Chemical Abstracts, Current Contents/Clinical Medicine, EMBASE/Excerpta Medica, MEDLINE/Index Medicus, and the Science Citation Index. According to the Journal Citation Reports, the journal has a 2014 impact factor of 3.02.

== See also ==
- Antiviral Chemistry & Chemotherapy
