= PharmAccess Foundation =

Non-profit organization

PharmAccess Foundation is a part of the PharmAccess Group. PharmAccess is an international non-profit organization with a digital agenda dedicated to connecting more people in sub-Saharan Africa to better healthcare. By making use of public-private partnerships, they leverage donor contributions, which they believe will pave the way for private investments thereby contributing to healthier populations and social and economic development. Currently, PharmAccess employs a multidisciplinary team of professionals in Tanzania, Kenya, Nigeria, Ghana and the Netherlands.

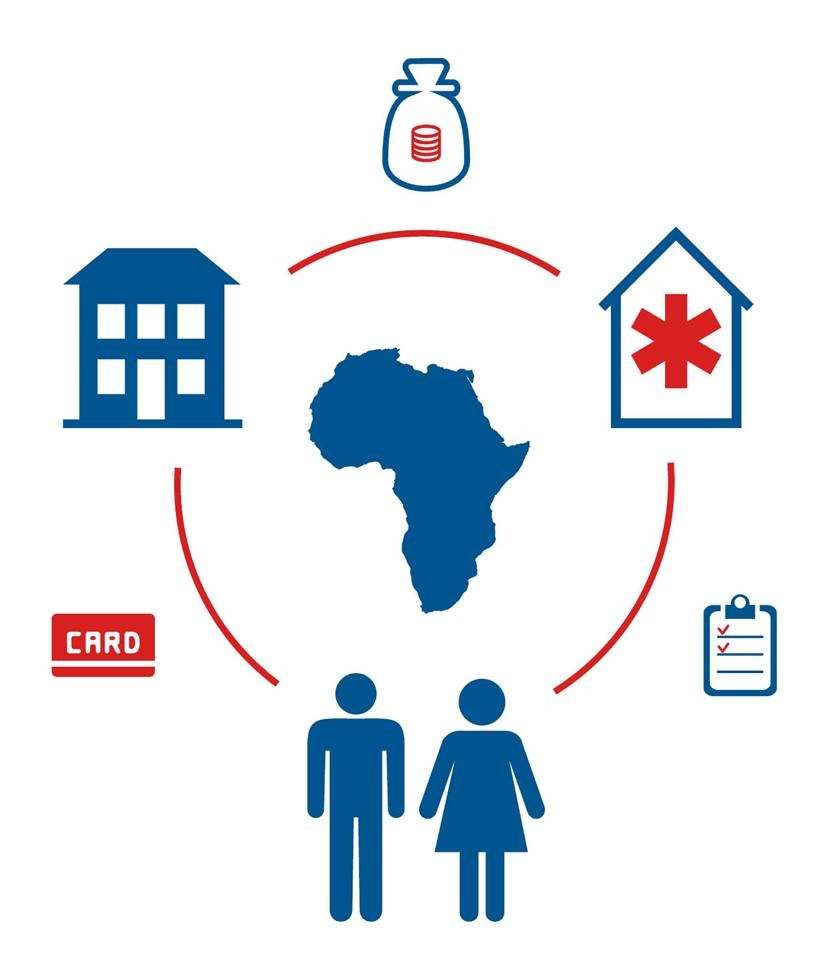
The PharmAccess Group

PharmAccess was founded in 2001 by HIV/AIDS researcher Prof. Joep Lange. He took an important first step for the organization by distributing life-saving medicines against HIV/AIDS in Africa in cooperation with multinationals. In 2007, PharmAccess was one of the two organizations that won a competition for a World Bank funding partnership.

Other leading individuals in the organization are Onno Schellekens, MsC, the managing director of the Investment Fund for Health in Africa, and Professor Tobias Rinke de Wit of the Amsterdam Institute for Global Health and Development.

All of the activities are co-funded by the Health Insurance Fund (HIF). In October 2006, the Health Insurance Fund signed a contract with the Dutch Ministry of Foreign Affairs to finance programs that provide access to affordable and quality healthcare among low-income populations in sub-Saharan Africa through the introduction of financing mechanisms (including health insurance) and the improvement of healthcare quality.

== History ==
Joep Lange of the Academic Medical Center (AMC) initiated PharmAccess in 2001, with support from the Dutch Aids Fonds, to bring life-saving antiretroviral therapy for HIV/AIDS treatment to Africa. Highly active antiretroviral therapy (HAART) was introduced in the developed world in the mid-nineties and immediately led to dramatic reductions in AIDS-related morbidity and mortality. In Africa, for the great majority of the population, adults and children, treatment was not available and many of the HIV/AIDS patients died of the disease.

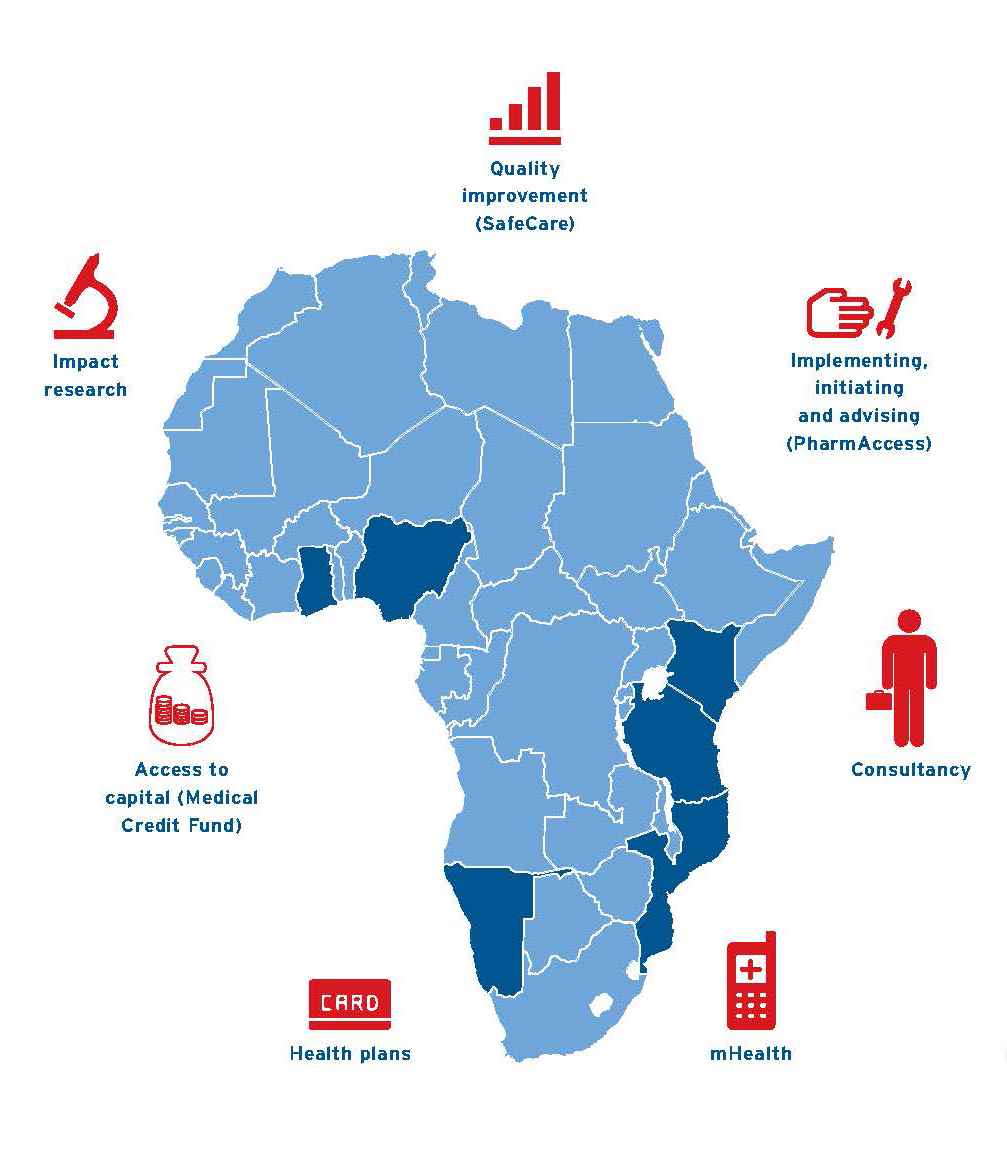
Map of activities in Africa

Initially, PharmAccess focused on the introduction of HIV/AIDS treatment programs for employees and dependents of Heineken in sub-Saharan Africa, which was revolutionary at the time. Soon they realized that these programs could be broadened to lay a foundation for the development of functional general health systems. The Dutch government, Dutch multinationals and PharmAccess joined forces to launch an alternative mechanism to the traditional development approach: a donor fund established to pilot health insurance for the currently uninsured in sub-Saharan Africa through the local private sector.

In order to enable the private companies in sub-Saharan Africa to grow and deliver the necessary services, a private investment fund (Investment Fund for Health in Africa, IFHA) was endorsed in 2007. This subsequently led to the formation of additional offshoots which all contribute to general health system strengthening and support to the health insurance schemes.

== Approach ==
The PharmAccess Group employs an integrated approach in order to improve access to quality health care. The group mobilizes public and private resources for the benefit of doctors and patients through insurance, loans to doctors, clinical standards and impact research. The PharmAccess Group state they have a different approach to development cooperation, by making use of public-private partnerships. PharmAccess works with various different African and international partners, donors and investors from both the private and the public sector.

The PharmAccess Group headquarters is located in the Netherlands. The group currently works from five country offices located in Tanzania, Kenya, Namibia, Nigeria and Ghana.

== Business lines ==
Members of the group that each play a crucial role in the funding and implementation of this approach are Health Insurance Fund, Medical Credit Fund, SafeCare and our independent research partner the Amsterdam Institute for Global Health and Development. The PharmAccess Group works with different business lines:

=== Supporting health plans ===
They work with local partners to make health insurance available for low income groups (such as cooperatives of farmers, organizations of market women or company employees). Members pay an insurance premium according to their means. The health plans and related initiatives are financed with public grants from the Dutch Government and World Bank, with increasing local government involvement.

=== Enabling investments ===
Medical Credit Fund provides loans to doctors and clinics in the private sector, enabling them to improve the quality of their services, develop their business potential and service more low-income patients. Medical Credit Fund aims to contribute to a healthier investment climate and increase the bankability and thus scalability of the private healthcare sector.

=== Improving quality ===
Sub-Saharan Africa has a shortage of institutions and standards that can ensure objective measurement of quality. SafeCare is a quality improvement program designed for resource-restricted healthcare facilities. SafeCare's internationally recognized set of standards aims to create a transparent improvement path that offers clinics positive incentives to move steadily upwards in quality.

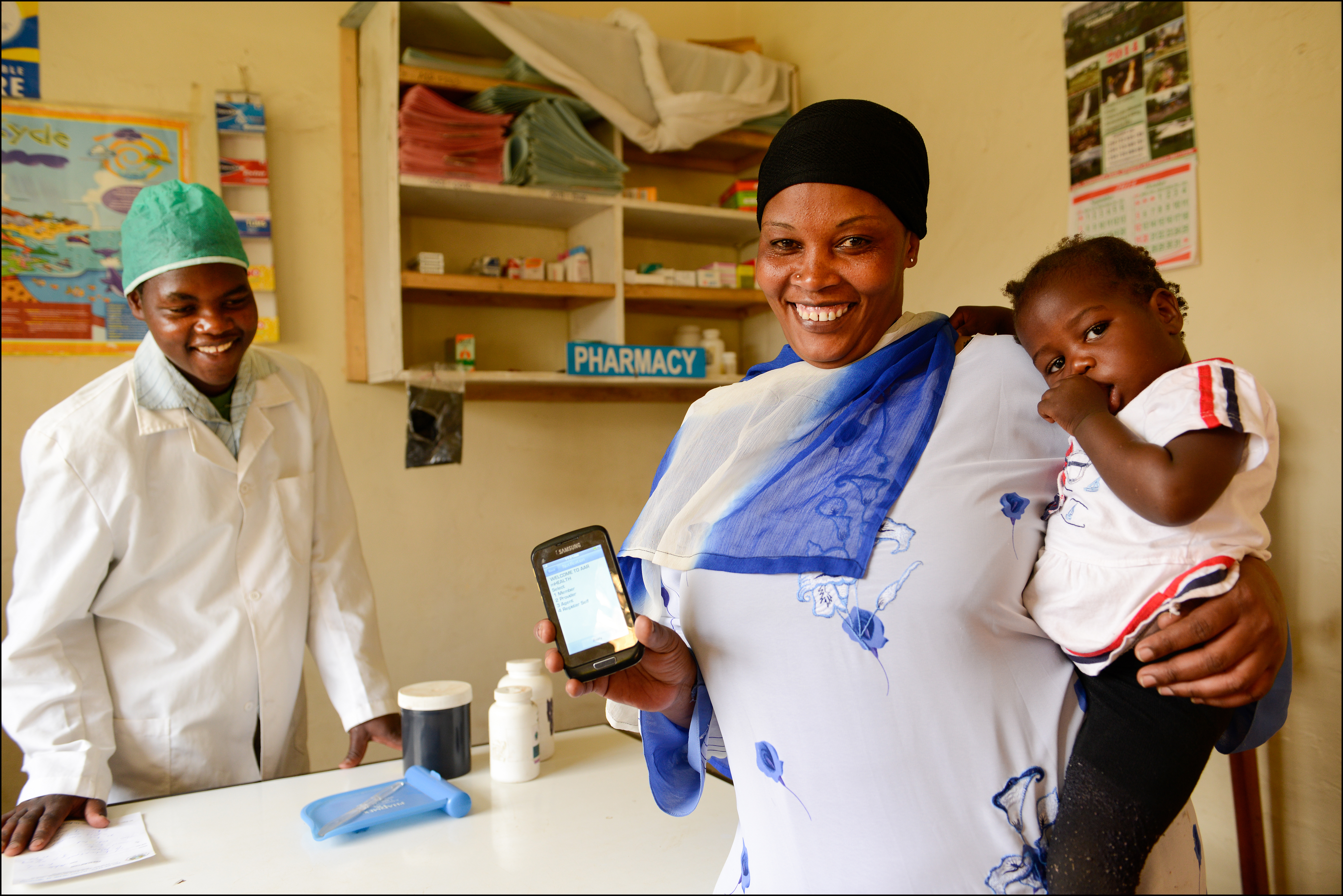
The mHealth Program's 'mobile health wallet' allows people to pay for healthcare services by using their mobile phone.

=== mHealth innovations ===
The PharmAccess mHealth Program manages healthcare payments from both public and private donors to healthcare providers for providing quality healthcare services to patients.

=== Implementing and initiating ===
PharmAccess Foundation acts as a coordinating, implementing and advising (consultancy) partner for each of its organizations. In addition, PharmAccess aims to regularly develop new initiatives to strengthen the integrated approach.

=== Funding ===
All of these activities are co-funded by the Health Insurance Fund. In October 2006, the Health Insurance Fund signed a contract with the Dutch Ministry of Foreign Affairs to finance programs that provide access to affordable and quality healthcare among low income populations in sub-Saharan Africa through the introduction of innovative financing mechanisms (including health insurance) and the improvement of healthcare quality.

== Impact ==
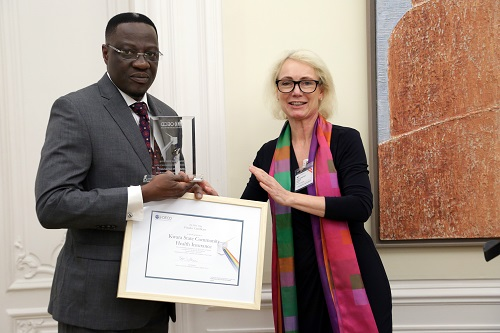
The Kwara State Health Insurance Program has been recognized as a best practice model for taking innovation to scale by the Development Assistance Committee (DAC) of the OECD. Charlotte Petri Gornitzka, Director General of the Swedish International Development Cooperation Agency (SIDA), presents the award to Abdulfatah Ahmed, Governor of Kwara State

The programs of the PharmAccess Group and its partners have had impact on different communities, for example in the Kwara State in Nigeria, where the Kwara State Community Health Program was launched in 2009. The Kwara State Government subsidizes 60% of the premiums and has committed to extend the program to 600,000 people over the next five years. The program is also funded by the Dutch Health Insurance Fund with support from the Dutch Ministry of Foreign Affairs, and implemented by PharmAccess and the Nigerian health maintenance organization Hygeia. During a visit to Nigeria, UN Secretary General Ban Ki-moon spoke about the program's unique character: ‘The groundbreaking Community Health Insurance of the Kwara State Government is exactly the kind of innovative partnership that we should replicate – here in Nigeria and beyond.’ This program represents the first time that a state government in Nigeria has partnered with the private sector and an NGO to provide statewide health insurance for its citizens.

The organization's work has attracted considerable international attention including a G20 prize (G20 Small Medium Enterprise Finance Challenge 2010) that President Obama presented for their healthcare financing model.
