= Journal of the International AIDS Society =

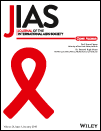
- Discipline: HIV, AIDS
- Language: English
- Edited by: Kenneth H. Mayer, Annette Sohn

Publication details
- History: 2004–present
- Publisher: John Wiley & Sons
- Frequency: Upon acceptance
- Open access: Yes
- License: Creative Commons Attribution License 3.0
- Impact factor: 5.396 (2020)

Standard abbreviations
- ISO 4: J. Int. AIDS Soc.

Indexing
- ISSN: 1758-2652
- OCLC no.: 271427446

Links
- Journal homepage

The Journal of the International AIDS Society (JIAS) is an official open-access, peer-reviewed, medical journal of the International AIDS Society. Founded in 2004 by Mark Wainberg, the journal covers all aspects of research on HIV and AIDS. Since October 2017, JIAS is published by John Wiley & Sons.

== Aims and scope ==
The journal's primary purpose is to provide an open-access platform for the generation and dissemination of evidence from a wide range of HIV-related disciplines, encouraging research from low- and middle-income countries. In addition, JIAS aims to strengthen capacity and empower less-experienced researchers from resource-limited countries.

The journal welcomes submissions on HIV-related topics from across all scientific disciplines, including but not limited to:

• Basic and biomedical sciences

• Behavioural sciences

• Epidemiology

• Clinical sciences

• Health economics and health policy

• Operations research and implementation sciences

• Social sciences and humanities, including political sciences and media

The journal operates under the leadership of its joint Editors-in-Chief, Prof Kenneth H. Mayer (USA) and Dr. Annette Sohn, as well as an editorial board made up of 46 leading scientists specialized in the disciplines covered by the journal.

The journal welcomes submissions from a variety of disciplines with the objectives of making available the most relevant information and of reaching all relevant stakeholders involved in all aspects of the HIV response. The journal strongly encourages submission of papers in the areas of implementation science and operational research, in particular from resource-limited settings. This is to ensure that information on best practices and culturally relevant research findings reaches the broadest possible international audience and stakeholders.

== Abstracting and indexing ==
The journal is abstracted and indexed in PubMed Central, PubMed/MEDLINE, Science Citation Index Expanded, Chemical Abstracts Service, CINAHL, EMBASE, and Scopus.

The journal received its first impact factor of 3.256 in 2012, which rose to 6.296 in 2017 (2016 Journal Citation Reports ® Science Edition). In 2017, the journal was ranked 6th out of 84 infectious diseases journals and 22nd out of 150 immunology titles on the Science Citation Indexes.

== Training on scientific writing, publication ethics and research integrity ==
JIAS also has a professional development programme and offers workshops at international conferences, which cover not only scientific writing, but also other aspects of publishing. These workshops, mainly attended by young researchers from resource-limited settings, are aimed at increasing the capacity of targeted delegates to publish their findings.

== List of Editors ==
The following persons have been editors-in-chief of the journal:

- Mark Wainberg: 2004–2017 (Founding Editor-in-Chief)
- Elly Katabira: 2004–2009
- Papa Salif Sow: 2009–2017
- Susan Kippax: 2009–2019
- Kenneth H. Mayer: 2017–present
- Annette Sohn: 2018–present

The following persons have been executive editors of the journal:

- Shirin Heidari: 2004–2013
- Marlène Bras: 2014–present
