= Prasert Thongcharoen =

Thai virologist (1933–2019)

Prasert Thongcharoen (ศาสตราจารย์เกียรติคุณ นายแพทย์ ประเสริฐ ทองเจริญ) (2 January 1933 - 9 July 2019) was a Thai virologist who specialised in the fields of SARS, HIV, Bird Flu and many other diseases. He graduated from Bernhard Nocht Institute for Tropical Medicine, Hamburg, and then started researching viral diseases straight after his graduation. He was Director of the World Health Organization (WHO) Collaborating Centre on AIDS and Member of the WHO Expert Committee Advisory Panel on Virus Diseases.
