= Resistance Database Initiative =

Not-for-profit organisation

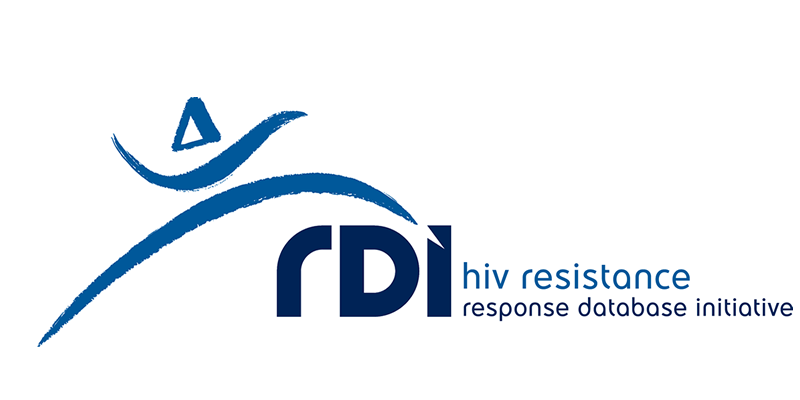
Resistance Database Initiative Logo

HIV Resistance Response Database Initiative (RDI) was formed in 2002 to use artificial intelligence (AI) to predict how patients will respond to HIV drugs using data from more 250,000 patients from around 50 countries around the world.

The RDI used its models to power its HIV Treatment Response Prediction System (HIV-TRePS). Launched in 2010, this free online tool enabled healthcare professionals to upload their patient’s data and obtain highly accurate predictions of how they would respond to different combinations of the 30 or more drugs available. The tool enabled physicians to individualize their patients’ treatment, using these predictions based on more than a million patient-years of treatment experience.

HIV-TRePS was possibly the first ever AI-based system for medical decision-making to be developed, successfully tested, and used in clinical practice. It has since been used by thousands of healthcare professionals to optimise the treatment of tens of thousands of patients.

Since the RDI’s inception the treatment of HIV infection has progressed enormously, with more effective and better tolerated drugs available in ever more convenient combination formulations. In most countries HIV is now considered a chronic, manageable condition. Moreover, the success of the drugs in reducing the amount of virus is substantially reducing the onward transmission of the virus and cases of new infections are falling in many settings.

This improvement in HIV treatment means the need for sophisticated AI to support HIV treatment decisions has significantly reduced. In response, the RDI ceased development of further models and, in March 2024, withdrew its HIV-TRePS system.

== Background ==
Human immunodeficiency virus (HIV) is the virus that causes acquired immunodeficiency syndrome (AIDS), a condition in which the immune system begins to fail, leading to life-threatening opportunistic infections.

There are approximately 30 HIV antiretroviral drugs that have been approved for the treatment of HIV infection, from six different classes, based on the point in the HIV life-cycle at which they act.

They are used in combination; typically 3 or more drugs from 2 or more different classes, a form of therapy known as highly active antiretroviral therapy (HAART). The aim of therapy is to suppress the virus to very low, ideally undetectable, levels in the blood. This prevents the virus from depleting the immune cells that it preferentially attacks CD4 cells and prevents or delays illness and death.

Despite the expanding availability of these drugs and the impact of their use, treatments continue to fail, often involving to the development of resistance. During drug therapy, low-level virus replication may still occur, particularly when a patient misses a dose. HIV makes errors in copying its genetic material and, if a mutation makes the virus resistant to one or more of the drugs in the patient's treatment, it may begin to replicate more successfully in the presence of that drug and undermine the effect of the treatment. If this happens, the treatment needs to be changed to re-establish control over the virus.

== RDI's Approach ==
The RDI’s approach was to use artificial intelligence (including neural network and random forest models), trained with data from hundreds of thousands of patients, treated with different drugs in a variety of clinical settings all over the world, to predict how an individual patient will respond to any new combination of HIV drugs. The models were tested with independent data sets and consistently achieved accuracy of approximately 80%.
