= Joep Lange =

Dutch clinical researcher (1954–2014)

- Born: Joseph Marie Albert Lange; 25 September 1954; Nieuwenhagen, Netherlands
- Died: 17 July 2014 (aged 59); Malaysia Airlines Flight 17, near Hrabove, Ukraine
- Cause of death: Aircraft shootdown
- Education: University of Amsterdam
- Occupations: Physician, medical researcher
- Employer: Amsterdam University Medical Centers
- Known for: Former president of the International AIDS Society; Founder of PharmAccess Foundation and Amsterdam Institute for Global Health and Development
- Spouse: Jacqueline van Tongeren
- Children: 5
- Website: www.joeplangeinstitute.org

Joseph Marie Albert "Joep" Lange (Dutch pronunciation: [ˈjoːsəf maːˈri ˈɑlbər tɕup ˈlɑŋə]; 25 September 1954 – 17 July 2014) was a Dutch clinical researcher specialising in HIV therapy. He served as the president of the International AIDS Society from 2002 to 2004. He was a passenger on Malaysia Airlines Flight 17, which was shot down on 17 July 2014 over Ukraine.

== Early life and education ==
Lange was born on 25 September 1954 in Nieuwenhagen in the Netherlands. He was a Youth for Understanding foreign exchange student from 1971 to 1972 at Robinson High School in Tampa, Florida. He later studied medicine at the University of Amsterdam, receiving his MD in 1981 and his PhD in 1987.

== Career ==
In 2001, he founded the "PharmAccess Foundation", a non-profit organisation based in Amsterdam which aims to improve access to HIV/AIDS therapy in developing countries, and he served as chairman until his death. Lange was a former president of the International AIDS Society (2002–04). Lange was also the Scientific Director of HIV[e]Ducation, an online learning system for medical doctors, nurses and counsellors working with HIV-positive people. He was also a founding editor of the medical journal, Antiviral Therapy.

In 2006, he became Professor of Medicine at the Academic Medical Center, University of Amsterdam and Senior Scientific Advisor to the International Antiviral Therapy Evaluation Centre, Amsterdam. He was also co-director of the HIV Netherlands Australia Research Collaboration, based in Thailand. Joep Lange established the Amsterdam Institute for Global Health and Development (AIGHD) in 2009 and uniquely positioned it to fill the gap of the ‘delivery perspective’ which has been largely neglected in academic approaches to global health. AIGHD links disciplines, resources and innovative programs from academic institutions and implementing partners in both the developed and developing world, with the ultimate aim to lead the way to access to high-quality health care for all inhabitants of this world. Lange also served on Accordia Global Health Foundation's Scientific Advisory Board.

He was a member of several societies, including the American Association for the Advancement of Science, American Society for Microbiology, and the International AIDS Society.

He received the Eijkman Medal for tropical medicine and international health in 2007.

Professor Lange was the inaugural principal investigator of the Tanzania Test & Treat project in Shinyanga, Tanzania. The Test & Treat initiative was public-private partnership between The Vatican, Gilead Sciences and two last mile NGOs supporting HIV scale-up in Tanzania.

=== HIV/AIDS prevention ===
During the mid-1990s, Lange began advocating for the use of combination therapy in the management of HIV/AIDS. He argued that it is an "illusion to think that monotherapy with any antiretroviral agent will have a major and lasting impact on this disease" because the development of drug resistance significantly lowers the efficacy of treatment. In 1996, Lange defended the work of controversial HIV/AIDS researcher David Ho, who treated infected patients by having them swallow 20 pills a day as part of a multidrug "cocktail" regimen. Although this experiment was heavily criticised, Lange explained to The Wall Street Journal that "David's work in the past few years has helped to completely transform our understanding of HIV".

Lange was also an important advocate for providing affordable AIDS medication to African countries, stating at one point that "(i)f we can get cold Coca-Cola and beer to every remote corner of Africa, it should not be impossible to do the same with drugs".

In 2003, Lange completed a study on the children of HIV-positive volunteer mothers in Rwanda and Uganda. He found that a baby's chance of contracting HIV falls to less than 1% if they receive anti-retroviral drugs while being nursed. The findings of the study were announced by Lange at the 2003 International AIDS Society meeting in Paris. During the 10th Conference on Retroviruses and Opportunistic Infections in Boston, Lange announced the results of a large multicenter clinical trial with the involvement of 1,216 patients in 17 countries. According to Lange, who served as principal investigator, these findings "clearly demonstrate the comparable efficacy of nevirapine and efavirenz in HIV treatment".

Two years later, he commented in an editorial for PLOS Medicine that activist groups have derailed several pre-exposure prophylaxis (PREP) clinical trials. He also expressed frustration that activist groups have prevented newer CCR5 receptor antagonists from being tested in Europe. However, Lange was criticised for neglecting the needs of sex workers in the trials, and other researchers asserted that the concerns raised by activists are "entirely legitimate" since the known toxic effects of so-called 'pre-exposure' drugs will lead to liver failure and kidney disease, thereby killing people rather than protecting them.

From 2010 to 2012, Lange was a regular participant in the annual Bangkok International Symposium on HIV Medicine, where he argued that PREP is substantially more effective than current methods for HIV prevention.

== Death ==
Lange and his partner Jacqueline van Tongeren were passengers on Malaysia Airlines Flight 17, which was shot down near Hrabove, Ukraine, on 17 July 2014. He was en route to Melbourne to attend the 20th International AIDS Conference, starting on 20 July. His death was mourned by his peers, with the IAS stating that they had "truly lost a giant", while conference delegates interviewed by the media were described as being in "total shock".

== Legacy ==
On 15 July 2015, the Joep Lange Institute and the Joep Lange Chair and Fellows program was announced. The institute is meant to continue the unique combination of scientific research, pragmatism and action that characterised Joep Lange. The first funding, consisting of $20 million from private sources in the United States, was confirmed. The Dutch Ministry of Foreign Affairs supports the Joep Lange Chair. To mark the announcement of the institute, former US President Bill Clinton shared a video message in which he honours Joep Lange's work and emphasises the importance of carrying forward his legacy. Operations started in late 2015.
