= International AIDS Society =

Association of HIV/AIDS professionals

- Founded: 1988; 38 years ago Stockholm, Sweden
- Headquarters: Geneva, Switzerland
- Key people: Beatriz Grinsztejn (President); Kevin Osborne (Executive Director)
- Revenue: 30,641,807 United States dollar (2024)
- Total assets: 28,160,206 United States dollar (2024)
- Number of employees: 52 (2016)

The International AIDS Society (IAS) is the world's largest association of HIV/AIDS professionals, with 11,600 members from over 170 countries as of July 2020, including clinicians, people living with HIV, service providers, policy makers and others. It aims to reduce the global impact of AIDS through collective advocacy. Founded in 1988, IAS headquarters are located in Geneva, and its president since 2024 is Beatriz Grinsztejn.

The IAS hosts the biennial International AIDS Conference, the IAS Conference on HIV Science, and the HIV Research for Prevention Conference.

== History ==
The IAS is a non-profit organization founded in 1988, with a mandate to organize the International AIDS Conference. Initially, the IAS headquarters were in Stockholm, and Lars-Olof Kallings was the secretary general from 1988 until 2003.

In 2004, the IAS restructured its organization, expanded the number of professional staff and moved the headquarters to Geneva. The move was intended to strengthen organizational links with other health NGOs and (United Nations) multilateral agencies.

== Mission and office-bearers ==
The IAS is an advocacy body, using its large membership base and scientific leadership to drive action. It is the world's largest association of HIV professionals, with 11,600 members from over 170 countries as of July 2020. Among its members are researchers, clinicians, people living with HIV, community advocates, policy makers and others.

Since August 2022, the president of IAS is Sharon Lewin, who is also the Director of the Peter Doherty Institute for Infection and Immunity, in Melbourne, Australia. The previous IAS President was Adeeba Kamarulzaman (since July 2020) of Malaysia, who succeeds Anton Pozniak. Kevin Osborne is executive director. Past presidents have included Helene D. Gayle, Joep Lange, Peter Piot, Linda-Gail Bekker, Chris Beyrer and Françoise Barré-Sinoussi.

== Conferences ==
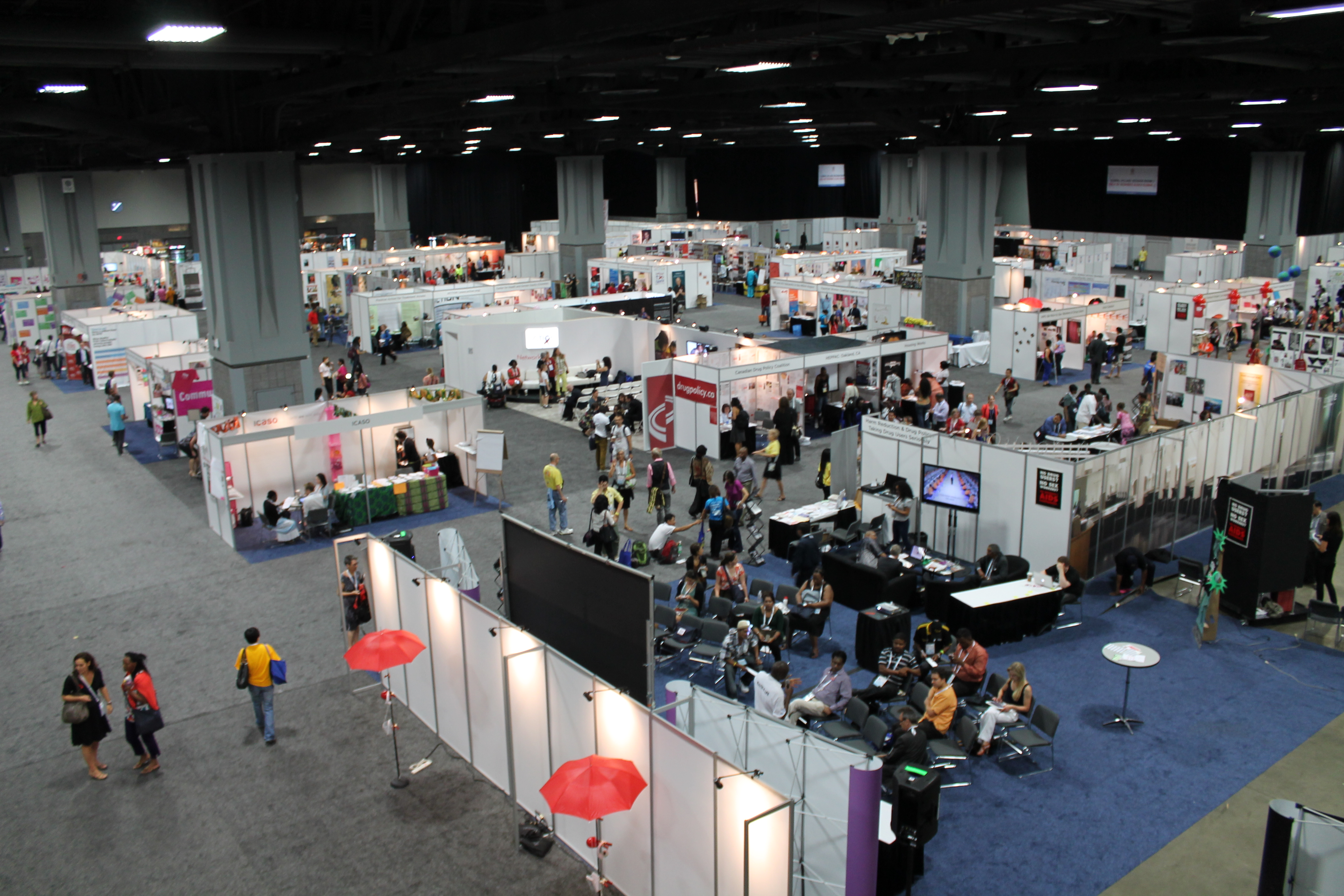
Global Village at 2012 International AIDS Conference

=== International AIDS Conference ===
The International AIDS Conference (abbreviated AIDS 2012, AIDS 2014 and so on) is the world's most attended conference on HIV and AIDS, and the largest conference on any global health or development issue in the world. First convened during the peak of the AIDS epidemic in 1985, they were held annually until 1994 when they became biennial. Each conference continues to provide a unique forum for the intersection of science, advocacy and human rights, as well as to strengthen policies and programmes that ensure an evidence-based response to the epidemic.

The 5th International AIDS Conference (AIDS 1989) in Montreal, Canada, from June 4 to 9, 1989, saw activists from ACT UP and its Canadian counterparts, AIDS Action Now! and Réaction-SIDA, raise awareness about HIV/AIDS challenges. Their disruption challenged the AIDS community's hierarchy, advocating for more activism and advocacy in scientific circles. Notably, Canadian activists protested the lack of a federally funded AIDS strategy, while US activists condemned the US travel ban on people living with HIV, among other issues.

The 16th International AIDS Conference (AIDS 2006) was held in Toronto, Canada, on August 13 to 18, 2006. The theme for the conference was "Time to Deliver."

The 22nd International AIDS Conference (AIDS 2018) was held in Amsterdam on 21 to 27 July 2018. Primary topics of note included: Use of dolutegravir as an antiretroviral medication was reported to result in increased rates of birth defects where the brain and spinal cord have openings (neural tube defects). Particularly of note was that an HIV infected person on treatment with undetectable virus does not spread it to an uninfected partner.

The 23rd International AIDS Conference (AIDS 2020) was held virtually on July 6 to 10, 2020, due to the COVID-19 pandemic. The theme for the conference was "Resilience."

The 24th International AIDS Conference (AIDS 2022), held both in Montreal and virtually from July 29 to August 2, 2022, centered around the theme "Re-engage and Follow the Science." At this conference, the Canadian Health Minister announced a significant investment of $17.9 million to enhance HIV testing accessibility, with a specific focus on priority populations in northern, remote, or isolated (NRI) communities within Canada.

=== IAS Conference on HIV Science ===
The IAS also organizes the IAS Conference on HIV Science (abbreviated IAS 2013, IAS 2015 and so on) (formerly called the IAS Conference on HIV Pathogenesis, Treatment and Prevention). This conference, the largest open scientific conference on HIV- and AIDS-related issues, occurs biennially and focuses on the biomedical aspects of HIV. The conference brings together professionals from around the world to examine the latest scientific developments in HIV research, prevention and treatment with a focus on moving science into practice and policy. It was held in Buenos Aires in 2001, Paris in 2003, Rio de Janeiro in 2005, Sydney in 2007, Cape Town in 2009, Rome in 2011, Kuala Lumpur in 2013, Vancouver in 2015, Paris in 2017, Mexico City in 2019, and Brisbane in 2023. The event was held virtually in 2021.

The conference was called the IAS Conference on HIV Pathogenesis, Treatment and Prevention until a name change after 2015.

== Publications and other resources ==
The society financially supports the publication of the Journal of the International AIDS Society (JIAS), an online, open-access, peer-reviewed medical journal covering all aspects of research on HIV and AIDS.

The IAS Online Resource Library is an online collection of abstracts and other resources from international conferences, as well as numerous other materials produced by the IAS launched in January 2010.

== Other activities ==
The IAS works with other regional HIV/AIDS societies and networks to strengthen the capacity of HIV professionals to respond to the epidemic at the regional level. The society runs the Industry Liaison Forum, whose mission is to remove barriers to research investment by the pharmaceutical industry in resource-limited settings. The IAS also provides professional development and training opportunities for HIV professionals at both international and regional AIDS conferences through its education programme.
