= Jan Steyaert =

Belgian bioengineer and molecular biologist

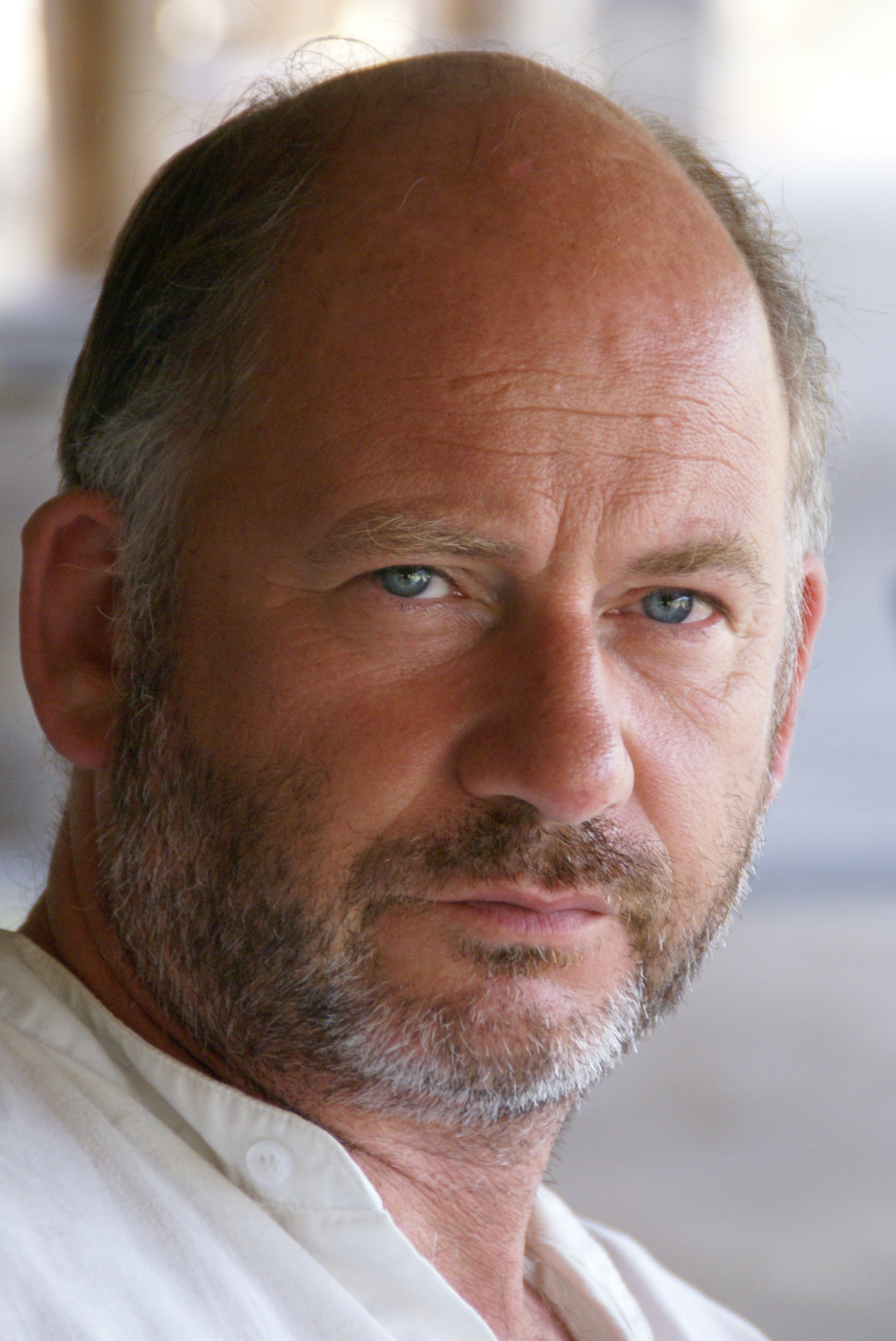
- Education: Vrije Universiteit Brussels
- Title: Prof.

Jan Steyaert is a Belgian bioengineer and molecular biologist. He started his career as an enzymologist but the Steyaertlab is best known for pioneering work on (engineered) nanobodies for applications in structural biology, omics and drug design. He is full professor and teaches biochemistry at the Vrije Universiteit Brussel and Director of the VIB-VUB Center for Structural Biology, one of the Research Centers of the Vlaams Instituut voor Biotechnologie (VIB). He was involved in the foundation of three spin-off companies: Ablynx, Biotalys, and Confo Therapeutics.

== Early life and education ==
Steyaert was born in Ukkel, Belgium. He grew up in the Flemish village of Alsemberg. He obtained a Master in Bioengineering at the Vrije Universiteit Brussel. For his PhD, he moved to Plant Genetic Systems, one of the very first biotech companies in Belgium. After obtaining his Ph.D., he relocated to Kenya to perform postdoctoral research at ILRAD (now ILRI), the International Livestock Research Institute.

== Academic career ==
In 1995, he returned to Belgium to become assistant professor in the Structural Biology Laboratory of Lode Wyns.

From 2015 to 2017, he was a Francqui Research Professor.

In 2020, he was elected as a member of the European Molecular Biology Organization.

== Research ==
Jan Steyaert pioneered the use of nanobodies as tools in structural biology. Nanobodies are the variable domains of heavy-chain only antibodies that naturally occur in camelids. Because of their small size and their beneficial biochemical and economic properties (size, affinity, specificity, stability, production cost), Steyaert applies nanobodies to freeze dynamic proteins into single functional conformations. X-ray crystallography or cryogenic electron microscopy can then be used to determine the structures of different stills of the same moving biomolecule.

In collaboration with Brian Kobilka the research team of Steyaert generated nanobodies elucidate the crystal structure of several G-protein-coupled receptors (GPCR), including the ß2 adrenergic receptor, the muscarinic acetylcholine receptor, the μ-opioid receptor, the metabotropic glutamate receptors and, as a first, the crystal structure of a GPCR-G protein complex.

Steyaert also applies nanobodies as versatile tools for investigating GPCR dynamics in vitro and inside cells, and for improved drug discovery. More recently, he started engineering Nanobodies for applications in cryo-EM.

== Awards ==
In 2016 he received The Prous Institute-Overton and Meyer Award for New Technologies in Drug Discovery for his pioneering work in the field of nanobody-enabled structural biology.

From 2019 onwards, Jan Steyaert is a Web of Science Highly Cited Researcher in the field of Biology and Biochemistry.

In 2022 he won the Brandeis' 24th Jacob and Louise Gabbay Award in Biotechnology and Medicine in recognition of his contributions to structural biology through the development of Camelid single-domain antibodies or nanobodies.

In 2024 he was rewarded an ERC advanced grant form the ERC council.

In 2025 he received the 2025 Christian B. Anfinsen Award, sponsored by The Protein Society, in recognition of technological achievements and significant methodological advances in the field of protein science.
