= Rudy Dekeyser =

Rudy Dekeyser was until May 2012 the Managing Director of VIB (the Flanders Institute for Biotechnology). He was until May 2012 head of the technology transfer team of the institute. He obtained a PhD in molecular biology at the University of Ghent.

He was director of DevGen and CropDesign and is a director of the biotech companies Ablynx, Peakadilly, Actogenix, EMBLEM (technology transfer company of EMBL) and FlandersBio. He is also co-founder of ASTP (Association or European Science and Technology Professionals) and visiting professor innovation and management at the University of Ghent.

== Career ==
Dekeyser holds a master's degree in zoology and a PhD in molecular biology from Ghent University. He was a co-founder of the Flanders Institute for Biotechnology (VIB) in 1995 and served as its managing director for 17 years, with responsibility for all business development. Under his leadership VIB built a large patent portfolio, signed hundreds of license and R&D agreements with companies worldwide, and established about a dozen start-up companies that raised more than €500 million. Companies established during this period include Devgen (acquired by Syngenta), CropDesign (acquired by BASF), Ablynx (acquired by Sanofi),ActoGeniX (acquired by Intrexon) and Multiplicom (acquired by Agilent).

He was also instrumental in building the bio-incubators and bio-accelerators of the Flemish life-sciences cluster and the 350-member biotech association FlandersBio. He co-founded the Association of European Science and Technology Transfer Professionals (ASTP) and chairs EMBLEM, the technology-transfer arm of the European Molecular Biology Laboratory (EMBL), and the EMBL's Technology Transfer Board.

== Venture investing ==
In 2012 Dekeyser joined the life-sciences investment firm LSP and became managing partner of its Health Economics Funds, which invest in private European and U.S. medical device, diagnostics and digital health companies. He has served on the boards of companies including Curetis, Sequana Medical, Lumeon, reMYND and Celyad.

== Sources ==
- VIB
