= Heavy-chain antibody =

Protein

A heavy-chain antibody is an antibody which consists only of two heavy chains and lacks the two light chains usually found in antibodies.

In common antibodies, the antigen binding region consists of the variable domains of the heavy and light chains (V_{H} and V_{L}). Heavy-chain antibodies can bind antigens despite having only V_{H} domains. This observation has led to the development of a new type of antibody fragments with potential use as drugs, so-called single-domain antibodies.

== Discovery ==
In 1989 a group of biologists led by Raymond Hamers at the Free University Brussels investigated the immune system of dromedaries. In addition to the expected four-chain antibodies, they identified simpler antibodies consisting only of two heavy chains. This discovery was published in Nature in 1993. In 1995 a research team at the University of Miami found a different type of heavy-chain antibodies in sharks.

== In cartilaginous fishes ==
A heavy-chain shark antibody (left) and a heavy-chain camelid antibody (middle) in comparison to a common antibody (right). Heavy chains are shown in a darker shade, light chains in a lighter shade.

The immunoglobulin new antigen receptor (IgNAR) of cartilaginous fishes (for example sharks) is a heavy-chain antibody. IgNAR shows significant structural differences to other antibodies. It has five constant domains (C_{H}) per chain instead of the usual three, several disulfide bonds in unusual positions, and the complementarity-determining region 3 (CDR3) forms an extended loop covering the site which binds to a light chain in other antibodies. These differences, in combination with the phylogenetic age of the cartilaginous fishes, have led to the hypothesis that IgNAR could be more closely related to a primordial antigen-binding protein than the mammalian immunoglobulins. To test this hypothesis, it would be necessary to discover IgNAR or similar antibodies in vertebrates that are phylogenetically still older, like the jawless fish lamprey and hagfish. Non-vertebrates do not have antibodies at all.

Sharks, and possibly other cartilaginous fishes, have immunoglobulin M (IgM) and immunoglobulin W (IgW) as well, both types with two heavy and two light chains.

== In camelids ==
The only mammals with heavy-chain (IgG-like) antibodies are camelids such as dromedaries, camels, llamas and alpacas. This is a secondary development: The heavy chains of these antibodies have lost one of their constant domains (C_{H}1) and undergone modifications in the variable domain (V_{H}), both structural elements necessary for the binding of light chains. In one subgroup, the missing C_{H}1 seems to be replaced by an extended hinge region, as shown in the image. Despite their different overall structure, camelid heavy-chain antibodies share several properties with IgNAR, for example the extended CDR3 loop and the conformation of the CDR1. It has been reasoned that these similarities are caused by functional requirements, or convergent evolution, rather than a genuine relationship.

About 50% of the antibodies in camelids are of the ordinary mammalian heavy/light-chain type. It is not known whether any type of animal has only heavy-chain antibodies and completely lacks the common type with two heavy and two light chains.

Heavy-chain camelid antibodies have been found to be just as specific as a regular antibody and in some cases they are more robust. As well, they are easily isolated using the same phage panning procedure used for traditional antibodies, allowing them to be cultured ex vivo in large concentrations. Phage-displayed dromedary camel V_{H}H libraries have been made for isolating single-domain antibodies against SARS-CoV-2 and other virus infections. The smaller size and single domain make these antibodies easier to transform into bacterial cells for bulk production, making them ideal for research purposes.
