= Hugo Van Heuverswyn =

Hugo Van Heuverswyn (born 1948) is a Belgian molecular biologist, biotech pioneer, entrepreneur and businessman. He has been the chairman of the VIB, Flanders Institute for Biotechnology, since its inception in 1995.

== Education ==
Hugo Van Heuverswyn obtained a chemistry degree at the University of Ghent in 1971 and a PhD in molecular biology in 1978 in the group of Prof. Walter Fiers, a first-tier pioneer in the field of modern biotechnology, in whose laboratory Van Heuverswyn and his colleagues realized the first ever decoding of a complete viral DNA genome (SV40). In the subsequent period 1979 – 1981 he was appointed visiting professor at the Oswaldo Cruz Foundation in Rio de Janeiro, where he established, together with Dr. Carlos Morel, the first DNA sequencing laboratory in Latin America.

== Career ==
Scientist and Entrepreneur: After his return to Belgium in 1981, he was invited to set up Biogent, a Belgian subsidiary of Biogen (one of the first biotech companies worldwide), to pursue the molecular cloning of TNF (Tumor Necrosis Factor) and other cytokines, a new class of biomolecules which at that time had just started to be discovered, but today are revolutionizing the field of immunology and anti-cancer therapy. In 1985, Hugo Van Heuverswyn initiated together with Rudi Mariën, the creation of Innogenetics, at a time that venture capital was still non-existing in Belgium. Van Heuverswyn served as chairman of Innogenetics when it developed in 1994 a new test to detect the presence of a strain of the AIDS virus. He continued to serve as CEO and board member till 2000, two years after INNX had become the first biotech company to list on EASDAQ in 1998 (a new European stock exchange for growth companies). At that time INNX had grown to over 700 employees, had filed numerous patents, had put more than 50 highly innovative IVD products in the market and realized a yearly turnover of over 50 million euro. In 2001, Hugo Van Heuverswyn founded, together with 2 former INNX colleagues, BioMARIC, a new Belgian biotech company active in prevention and control of infectious diseases, where he acts as CEO until today. In addition to his private activities, Hugo Van Heuverswyn was also continuously involved in the creation of the biotechnology ecosystem in Flanders. For 18 years, from its inception in 1995 till 2013, he was Chairman of the Flemish Institute of Biotechnology (VIB), during which period he created, together with Rudy DeKeyser, flanders.bio (2003), the association of Flemish biotech companies where he is still serving as a board member, and in 2016 he co-founded Flanders Vaccine, a non-profit organization aiming to stimulate the translation of basic research into clinical applications in the field of vaccination and immunotherapy. At present his main interest goes to translational research, One Health and personalized medicine, particularly in the field of microbiota and infection and immunity.

== See also ==
- Rudy Dekeyser

== Sources ==
- J. Comijn, P. Raeymaekers, A. Van Gysel, M. Veugelers, Today = Tomorrow : a tribute to life sciences research and innovation : 10 years of VIB, Snoeck, 2006, ISBN 978-90-5349-630-5
- Hugo Van Heuverswyn
- VIB Board
- Biomaric
