= Johan Thevelein =

Belgian molecular biologist

Johan Thevelein is a Belgian molecular biologist and professor at the Katholieke Universiteit Leuven (Leuven, Belgium). He is head of the VIB Department of Molecular Biology, KU Leuven.

Johan Thevelein obtained a PhD from the KU Leuven in 1981. He did a Postdoc at Yale University in Connecticut, United States from 1982 until 1983, and he is the Scientific Director of the VIB Department of Molecular Microbiology since 2002. From 2015 to 2018 he was also the Chief Scientific Officer at GlobalYeast, a spin off company that will develop and deliver superior industrial strains.

His research interest is on the molecular genetics and biochemistry of nutrient-sensing and -signaling in Saccharomyces cerevisiae (yeast).

== Sources ==
- VIB Department of Molecular Microbiology
- Laboratory of Molecular Cell Biology
- Johan Thevelein
