= Zn2+-exporting ATPase =

zinc-exporting ATPase

Identifiers
- EC no.: 3.6.3.5

Databases
- IntEnz: IntEnz view
- BRENDA: BRENDA entry
- ExPASy: NiceZyme view
- KEGG: KEGG entry
- MetaCyc: metabolic pathway
- PRIAM: profile
- PDB structures: RCSB PDB PDBe PDBsum
- Gene Ontology: AmiGO / QuickGO
Search
- PMC: articles
- PubMed: articles
- NCBI: proteins

In enzymology, a Zn^{2+}-exporting ATPase (EC 3.6.3.5) is an enzyme that catalyzes the chemical reaction

ATP + H_{2}O + Zn^{2+}_{in} $\rightleftharpoons$ ADP + phosphate + Zn^{2+}_{out}

The 3 substrates of this enzyme are ATP, H_{2}O, and Zn^{2+}, whereas its 3 products are ADP, phosphate, and Zn^{2+}.

This enzyme belongs to the family of hydrolases, specifically those acting on acid anhydrides to catalyse transmembrane movement of substances. The systematic name of this enzyme class is ATP phosphohydrolase (Zn^{2+}-exporting). Other names in common use include Zn(II)-translocating P-type ATPase, P1B-type ATPase, and AtHMA4 (the A. thaliana protein).

== Structural studies ==
As of late 2007, two structures have been solved for this class of enzymes, with PDB accession codes PDB: 1MWY and PDB: 1MWZ. Moreover, nanobodies have recently been raised against a zinc-transporting ATPase (ZntA) which are able to bind and inhibit the ATPase activity, showing potential for further structural studies.
