= Raymond Hamers =

Belgian professor (1932–2021)

- Born: 7 September 1932
- Died: 22 August 2021 (aged 88)
- Known for: discovery of single-domain antibodies

Academic work
- Discipline: immunology
- Institutions: Vrije Universiteit Brussel

Raymond Hamers (7 September 1932 – 22 August 2021) was a professor at the Vrije Universiteit Brussel in Brussels, Belgium. He discovered a special type of antibodies called single-domain antibodies or nanobodies.

== See also ==
- Flanders Institute for Biotechnology (VIB)
- Ablynx
