= Oystershell =

Oystershell may refer to:

- The shell of an oyster
- A product made from the shell of the oyster, such as calcium supplements for humans or laying hens
- Oystershell scale, a type of insect
- Oystershell NV, a technology company in over-the-counter medicinal products
