= Switch Laboratory =

Belgian research institute at KU Leuven

The VIB Switch laboratory, Katholieke Universiteit Leuven is a department of VIB located at the Katholieke Universiteit Leuven in Leuven, Belgium. The laboratory is headed by Frederic Rousseau and Joost Schymkowitz.

Its research focuses on the functional regulation of cellular processes, which are governed by protein conformational switches that have to be actively controlled to ensure cell viability. The laboratory combines in vitro biophysical techniques and computational structural biology methods with advanced cell biological studies.

== Sources ==
- J. Comijn, P. Raeymaekers, A. Van Gysel, M. Veugelers, Today = Tomorrow : a tribute to life sciences research and innovation : 10 years of VIB, Snoeck, 2006, ISBN 978-90-5349-630-5
- Switch laboratory (VIB)
- Switch laboratory (Katholieke Universiteit Leuven)
