= Rudi Mariën =

Belgian scientist and businessman

Rudi Mariën is a Belgian scientist and businessman. He is chairman of the Belgian biotech company Innogenetics.

== Education ==
Rudi Mariën obtained a degree in pharmaceutical sciences from the University of Ghent, specializing in clinical biology.

== Career ==
=== Clinical laboratories ===
Mariën has said he wanted to set up his own laboratory from the start of his studies. He began with a small team in an apartment in Ghent, focusing on laboratory tests supporting clinical trials, and expanded internationally, including to Singapore, South Africa and the United States. He founded the Barc Group, an international centralized clinical laboratory dedicated exclusively to pharmaceutical studies. He was also vice-president of Cerba European Lab.

=== Innogenetics ===
On 18 July 1985 Mariën co-founded Innogenetics together with Erik Tambuyzer and Hugo Van Heuverswyn and was its chairman and a reference shareholder. The company was later sold to Solvay; after Solvay's pharmaceutical business passed to Abbott, Innogenetics was sold on to Fujirebio.

=== Biovest and investments ===
After the sale of Innogenetics, Mariën turned to investing in Belgian biotechnology companies, mainly through Biovest and his management company Gengest, of which he is president and managing director. He has said he invested in Devgen after it was listed, in Actogenix (sold to Intrexon), in Multiplicom and in MDxHealth. In April 2011 Biovest took a stake of about 9% in MDxHealth during a private placement of $11.7 million.

Biovest and his son Stefan Mariën co-funded Bioscape, a bio-incubator near the Technology Park in Ghent. he Mariën family has also initiated Obelisc, a bio-accelerator planned in the Ghent science park.

== Sources ==
- Rudi Mariën
- Ik had met plezier aandelen bijgekocht (in Dutch)
