= Frederic Rousseau =

Belgian molecular biologist

See Frédéric Rousseau for the French historian of World War I

Frederic Rousseau is a Flemish Belgian molecular biologist and researcher at the KU Leuven (Leuven, Belgium). Together with Joost Schymkowitz he is group leader at the VIB Switch Laboratory, KU Leuven. His research interest is on essential cellular processes where functional regulation is governed by protein conformational switches that have to be actively controlled to ensure cell viability

He obtained a PhD at the University of Cambridge (Cambridge, United Kingdom) in 2001. He did a post-doctorate work at the EMBL in Heidelberg Germany from 2001 until 2003. Rousseau is a VIB Group leader since 2003.

== Sources ==
- Switch Laboratory (VIB)
- Virtual Department for Structural Biology (Vrije Universiteit Brussel)
