= Anthony Cashmore =

New Zealand molecular biologist (born 1941)

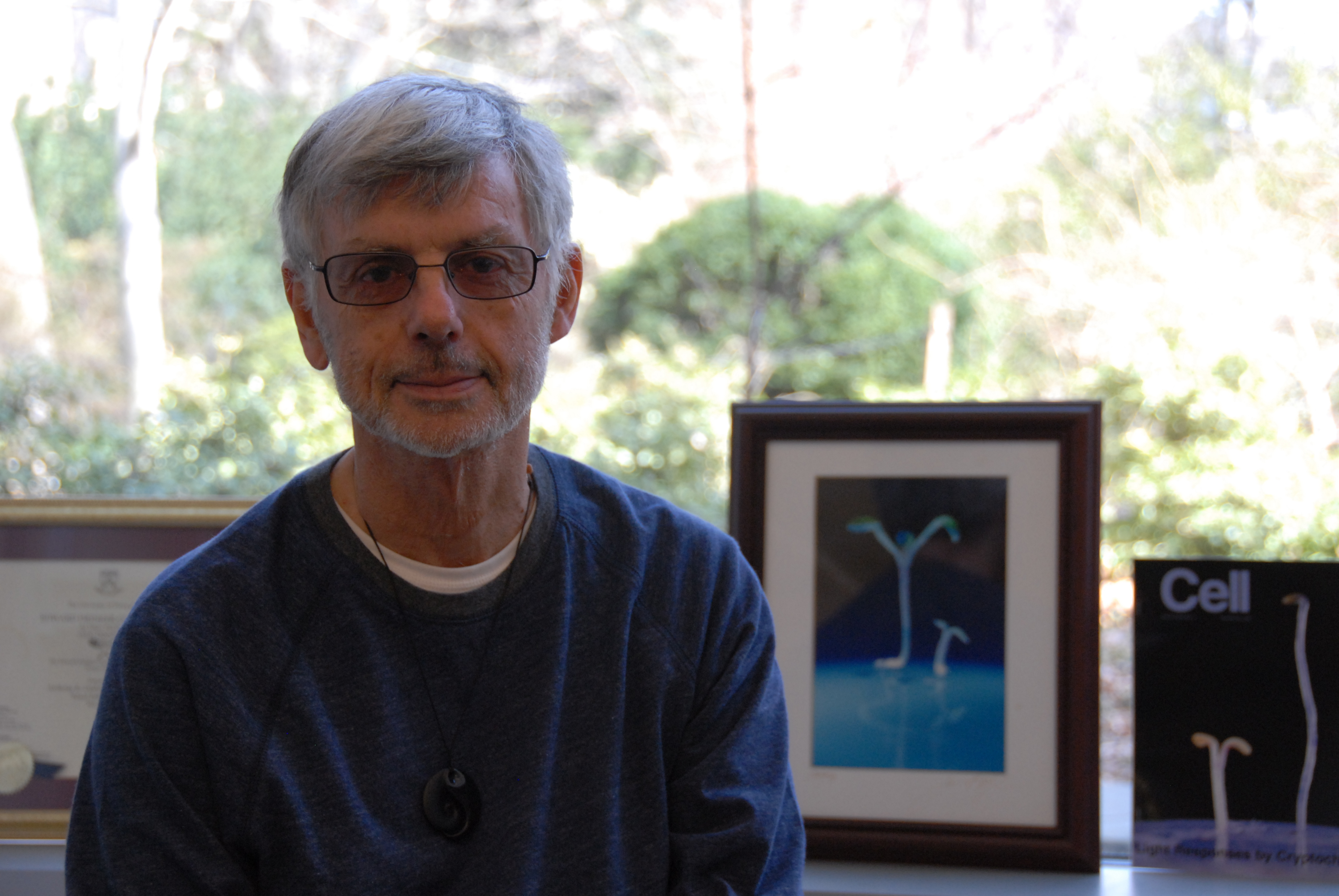
- Born: Anthony R. Cashmore; 22 January 1941 (age 85); Auckland, New Zealand
- Education: University of Auckland (BS, MS, PhD)
- Known for: Discovery of cryptochrome, the blue light photoreceptor in Arabidopsis
- Spouse: Nancy Bonini
- Awards: Elected Member of the National Academy of Sciences
- Scientific career
- Fields: Plant biology Molecular biology
- Workplaces: University of Pennsylvania (Professor Emeritus); Rockefeller University (Associate Professor)

Anthony Robert Cashmore (born 22 January 1941) is a New Zealand biochemist and plant molecular biologist, best known for identifying cryptochrome photoreceptor proteins. These specialized proteins are critical for plant development and play an essential role in circadian rhythms of plants and animals. A Professor emeritus in the Department of Biology at the University of Pennsylvania, Cashmore led the Plant Science Institute from the time of his appointment in 1986 until his retirement in 2011. He was elected to the National Academy of Sciences in 2003.

== Early life and education ==
Born in Auckland, New Zealand, in 1941, Cashmore grew up in Manawaru and Te Aroha. As a teenager, Cashmore worked in Palmerston North in the Grasslands Division of New Zealand's Department of Scientific and Industrial Research (DSIR).

Cashmore enrolled at the University of Auckland, majoring in chemistry and completing a Bachelor of Science degree in 1962, Master of Science degree in 1963, and Ph.D. degree in 1966. In 1968 Cashmore moved to Cambridge (UK) to pursue postdoctoral studies at the University of Cambridge Department of Chemistry, and later at the MRC Laboratory of Molecular Biology. In 1971 Cashmore moved to the United States, where he worked as a Research Associate in the laboratory of Michael Chamberlin at the University of California, Berkeley before returning to New Zealand.

In 1979, Cashmore took a position at the Rockefeller University (New York), first as a visiting scientist in the laboratory of Nam-Hai Chua, and then as an assistant professor, then Associate Professor. In 1986, Cashmore was appointed the Director of the Plant Science Institute at the University of Pennsylvania (Philadelphia). He retired in 2011 and is currently an Emeritus Professor of Biology at the University of Pennsylvania.

== Career ==
=== Prostratin ===
During his PhD studies, Cashmore purified the toxic component of Pimelea prostrata, a New Zealand toxic shrub. Using partition chromatography, Cashmore purified and crystallized the active component, referred to as prostratin. Cashmore's studies showed that prostratin was strikingly similar to the co-carcinogenic phorbol esters of croton oil, a relationship that was subsequently confirmed using chemical synthesis and x-ray crystallography approaches.

=== Nucleic acid chemistry ===
==== Hydrazine degradation ====
Working with George Petersen (a New Zealand biochemist) at New Zealand's Department of Scientific and Industrial Research (DSIR) (Palmerston North), Cashmore was introduced to the study of nucleic acids and how selective chemical reagents could be used to determine the nucleic acid sequence of DNA. Cashmore and Petersen examined the use of hydrazine as a tool to measure purine nucleotides in samples of DNA. Recognizing that hydrazine-treated DNA subsequently exposed to alkali conditions undergoes degradation, Cashmore defined a quantitative technique for measuring purine nucleotides in DNA samples. Subsequently, Allan Maxam and Walter Gilbert employed the hydrazine degradation approach to develop Maxam–Gilbert sequencing, the first widely adopted method for DNA sequencing.

==== tRNA ====
Working with Dan Brown at Cambridge University, Cashmore demonstrated that the reagent methoxyamine reacted with a limited number of cytosine residues in tRNA. Later, Cashmore used the RNA sequencing procedure that had recently been developed by Fred Sanger to identify the reactive cytosine residues in a tyrosine suppressor tRNA of Escherichia coli. Studying a mutant of this tRNA, Cashmore identified a new reactive cytosine residue at the base of loop III. This finding suggested that base pairing of conserved residues occurred supporting one of the early models proposed for the three dimensional structure of transfer RNA.

=== Biosynthesis of RuBisCO ===
Ribulose-1,5-bisphosphate carboxylase/oxygenase (RuBisCO), thought to be the world's most abundant protein, utilizes photosynthetic energy to fix carbon dioxide through the conversion of ribulose-1,5-bisphosphate to two molecules of 3-phosphoglycerate. It is an enzyme of interest in the field of climate change due to its role in fixing carbon dioxide. At New Zealand's DSIR Palmerston North, Cashmore studied the biosynthesis of RuBisCO, a multi-subunit (eight large and eight small subunits) protein located in plant chloroplasts. Using selective inhibitors of protein synthesis Cashmore showed that in contrast to the RuBisCO large subunit (which was known to be synthesized on chloroplast ribosomes), the small subunit of RuBisCO was produced as a soluble precursor protein on cytoplasmic ribosomes. The soluble precursor protein is subsequently processed and imported into chloroplasts.

=== Light-regulated enhancer sequences ===
At Rockefeller University, Cashmore studied DNA sequences associated with light regulated expression of a pea nuclear RuBisCO small subunit gene. For these studies, Cashmore collaborated with scientists in the laboratory of Jeff Schell and Marc Van Montagu in Ghent (Belgium). Using transgenic plant cells, they demonstrated that in the pea plant, light-regulated expression was mediated by a 1 kilobase (kb) promoter fragment. In a second study, this DNA fragment was shown to have the properties of an enhancer sequence, functioning in either orientation and when fused to a normally non-light-regulated promoter.

=== Cryptochrome ===
In 1881, Francis Darwin and Charles Darwin demonstrated that plants exhibited a phototropic response to blue light. Elusive to discovery, scientists gave the name cryptochrome to the photoreceptor factor(s) responsible for this effect. Interested in adopting the "power of Arabidopsis genetics" for the study of light regulation, in 1980 Cashmore, working with post-doctoral student Margaret Ahmad, identified Arabidopsis mutants that showed reduced sensitivity to blue light. Using DNA sequencing and complementation techniques, Cashmore and Ahmed cloned the gene and discovered that the mutants were alleles of a previously identified hy4 mutant. Ahmad and Cashmore called this blue light photoreceptor "cryptochrome", and it is now referred to as CRY1. Cashmore's research group identified a second member of the cryptochrome family (CRY2) using cDNA library screening. This research was the foundation that led to the identification of CRY proteins in other plant species, bacteria, fungi, animals, and humans, as well as research that defined the pivotal role of these proteins in circadian clock regulation across species and as the primary sensory molecule enabling light-dependent magnetic compass orientation in migratory birds. Today, light-based diagnostic and therapeutic wearable photonic healthcare devices, are based on the function of the cryptochrome photoreceptors.

=== Human behavior, free will and consciousness ===
In recent years, Cashmore turned his attention to the topic of human behavior, studying the concepts of free will and consciousness. In a publication on this topic, Cashmore noted that in popular discussions regarding the relative importance of nature vs nurture, an element that is commonly missing is awareness that individuals are responsible for neither their genetic inheritance nor their environment. Based on this observation, he therefore asked "where does this notion of free will come from?" and challenged the scientific community to reconsider the concept of free will.

Applying the scientific method to probe the concept from a Philosophy of Information approach, Cashmore argued that all biological systems – including humans – obey the laws of chemistry and physics. Cashmore further suggested that the concept of free will "is an illusion, akin to religious beliefs or the outdated belief in vitalism", equivalent to the continuing belief in Cartesian duality, and therefore contradictory to society's interpretation of accountability in the criminal justice system. The article stimulated discussion and analysis by scientists in the fields of biology, behavioral sciences, and philosophy. Scientist and author Jerry Coyne stated that after reading this article on determinism and the criminal justice system, he was ‘instantly converted to determinism’.

== Honors and awards ==
Cashmore was a Professor of Biology at the University of Pennsylvania and Director of the Plant Science Institute there until his retirement in 2011. Since 2011, he has been a Professor emeritus at the University of Pennsylvania (Department of Biology). Cashmore has authored more than 100 refereed research papers and has served on the editorial boards of the publications Plant Molecular Biology, The Plant Journal, and the Proceedings of the National Academy of Sciences of the United States of America. He was elected to the National Academy of Sciences in 2003.

== Selected publications ==
=== Journal articles ===
- Herrera-Estrella L, Van den Broeck G, Maenhaut R, Van Montagu M, Schell J, Timko M, and Cashmore A (1984). Light-inducible and chloroplast-associated expression of a chimaeric gene introduced into Nicotiana tabacum using a Ti plasmid vector. Nature 310, 115–120. PMID 6330570
- Timko MP, Kaush AP, Castresana C, Fassler J, Herrera-Estrella L, Van den Broeck G, Van Montagu M, Schell J, and Cashmore AR (1985). Light regulation of plant gene expression by an upstream enhancer-like element. Nature 318, 579–582. PMID 3865055
- Ahmad M and Cashmore AR (1993). HY4 gene of A. thaliana encodes a protein with characteristics of a blue-light photoreceptor. Nature 366, 162–166. PMID 8232555
- Lin C, Robertson D, Ahmad M, Raibekas A, Jorns M, Dutton P, and Cashmore A. (1995). Association of flavin adenine dinucleotide with the Arabidopsis blue light receptor CRY1. Science 269, 968–970. PMID 7638620
- Cashmore, A (2010). The Lucretian swerve: The biological basis of human behavior and the criminal justice system. PNAS 107 (10), 4499–4504. PMID 20142481

=== Patents ===
- US 5728925, Herrera-Estrella, Luis; Van Den Broeck, Guido & Van Montagu, Marc et al., "Chimaeric gene coding for a transit peptide and a heterologous polypeptide", published 1998-03-17, assigned to Bayer AG and Plant Genetic Systems NV
- US 5824859, Cashmore, Anthony Robert; Ahmad, Margaret & Lin, Chentao, "Blue light photoreceptors and methods of using the same", published 1998-10-20, assigned to The Trustees of the University of Pennsylvania

=== Book chapters ===
- Jarillo J, Capel J, and Cashmore AR (2004). "Chapter 8: Physiological and molecular characteristics of plant circadian clocks", in Molecular Biology of Circadian Rhythms

== Personal life ==
Cashmore was born in Auckland (New Zealand), to parents Nancy and Norman Cashmore. He is married to American Neuroscientist and Geneticist Nancy Bonini.
