= Xavier Saelens =

Belgian scientist (born 1965)

Xavier Saelens (born 1965) is a Belgian scientist and currently his main research interest is finding a universal influenza vaccine. He is a lecturer in Virology and Group Leader of the Molecular Virology Unit at the University of Ghent (Ghent, Belgium).

== Education ==
Saelens obtained a bachelor's degree in Biology at the University of Ghent in 1985, and a master's degree in Biotechnology and also a PhD in Biotechnology (1990). Saelens is married and has two children.

== Career ==
Saelens worked as a Postdoc at the University of Ghent from 1990 until 2004 and he is VIB Project Leader since 2005. His current research focuses on the development and characterisation of novel influenza A and B vaccines. Together with Walter Fiers and their team, he works on the development of an M2e-based vaccine.
