= Innogenetics =

Innogenetics N.V. (now Fujirebio Europe N.V.) was an international in vitro diagnostics (IVD) company, with headquarters in Ghent, Belgium. Founded in 1985, the company developed and marketed IVD testing solutions as well as OEM raw materials. The company was acquired in September 2010 by Japanese Fujirebio Inc., an H.U. Group Holdings, Inc company, and changed name to Fujirebio Europe on October 1, 2013. The current CEO of Fujirebio Europe N.V. is Christiaan De Wilde.

== History ==
Innogenetics was founded on 18 July 1985, by Erik Tambuyzer, Hugo Van Heuverswyn and Rudi Mariën. In 1992, the company launched the first commercial tests for cystic fibrosis in Europe (INNO-LiPA CFTR) and in 1993 the first commercial test for Hepatitis C virus (HCV) genotyping worldwide (INNO-LiPA HCV). In 1995, the first commercial Alzheimer's disease research test for hTau was launched (INNOTEST hTau Ag). In 1998, the company launched the first commercial Alzheimer's disease research test for β-Amyloid and in 2002 the first commercial test for Hepatitis B virus (HBV) genotyping (INNO-LiPA HBV Genotyping).

The company was one of the first biotech companies to be listed on a European stock exchange, in 1996 it was the first biotech company listed on EASDAQ, now NASDAQ Europe. Until 2008 Innogenetics had its shares traded on Euronext Brussels.

Innogenetics N.V. was acquired by Fujirebio in 2010 and changed name to Fujirebio Europe N.V. on October 1, 2013.
