= Hypervariable =

Hypervariable may refer to:

- Hypervariable sequence, a segment of a chromosome characterised by considerable variation in the number of tandem repeats at one or more loci
- Hypervariable locus, a locus with many alleles; especially those whose variation is due to variable numbers of tandem repeats
- Hypervariable region (HVR), a chromosomal segment characterized by multiple alleles within a population for a single genetic locus
