= Erik Tambuyzer =

Belgian bio-engineer and businessman (born 1949)

Erik Tambuyzer (born 1949) is a Belgian bio-engineer and businessman. He is Chairman of the Board of the Flemish Center for Medical Innovation (CMI).

== Education ==
Tambuyzer holds a doctoral degree in bio-engineering sciences from the Katholieke Universiteit Leuven, (Leuven, Belgium).

== Career ==
Having started his professional career at Baxter Healthcare (Baxter-Travenol in Europe) in 1977, Tambuyzer pursued his career six years later at Innovi NV (Brussels, Belgium), a technology management and consultancy company. He also worked as a consultant on biotechnology for minister-president Gaston Geens of the Flemish government. In 1985 he made the business plan and co-founded, together with Hugo Van Heuverswyn, the healthcare biotech company Innogenetics NV (Ghent, Belgium), of which he was General Manager until 1992, at which time he joined Genzyme. He was Senior Vice President Corporate Affairs for Genzyme Europe and International, and a member of the European Management Committee of Genzyme Corporation until 2010, when he joined the Flemish Center for Medical Innovation (CMI).

Tambuyzer is a founding Board member and past Chairman of EuropaBio, the European Association for Bioindustries, and founder of the Ethics Working Group of this Association, as well as the Chair of the joint EBE/EFPIA-EuropaBio Orphan medicines Task Force. He is also Vice-Chair of EPPOSI, the European Platform for Patients' Organizations, Science & Industry. He published on policies regarding orphan medicines and advanced therapies in Europe and internationally, on the European Clinical Trial Directive, and on the impact of biotechnology on healthcare systems.

== Sources ==
- Global biotech speakers
- Europe's researchers ready for entrepreneurism
