= Oystershell NV =

Belgian pharmaceutical laboratory

- Industry: chemical
- Founded: 1979
- Headquarters: Ghent
- Website: https://www.oystershell.com/

Oystershell NV is a Belgian pharmaceutical laboratory based in Merelbeke for over-the-counter products.

== History ==
Established in 1979 in Flanders, Belgium, Oystershell was originally a miller of oyster calcium carbonate for laying hens. In the 1980s it gradually evolved from this agricultural background to veterinary medicines. Since a management buy-out in 2002 it is owned by the current management and the biotech investor Rudi Mariën. The company is primarily involved in over the counter drugs and health products as medical devices, biocides, cosmetics and food supplements.
