= Christiaan De Wilde =

Belgian businessman

Christiaan De Wilde is a Belgian businessman, and he is at present the chief executive officer of the biotech company Fujirebio Europe NV, a member of Japan-based Fujirebio.

== Education ==
Christiaan De Wilde in Accountancy at the Hogeschool Gent (BME) (Ghent) and obtained a degree in taxation and a master's degree in industrial entrepreneurship, both at EHSAL (Brussels).

== Career ==
In October 1988, he started his career at Johnson & Johnson, where he would stay for 17 years. From June 2000 until May 2005, he was finance and logistics director for the Benelux and a member of the board of Johnson & Johnson Medical BV (Netherlands). Until August 2006, he was finance and logistics director and a member of the board of Janssen-Cilag Belgium NV.

On 1 September 2006, he was appointed chief financial and administration officer of Innogenetics (today Fujirebio Europe) and on 15 October 2007, he became executive officer and a member of the board.

== Sources ==
- Christiaan De Wilde
- Innogenetics appoints Christiaan De Wilde as Chief Financial Officer
- Innogenetics names Christiaan De Wilde as CFO from Sept 1
