= Immunoglobulin heavy chain =

Large polypeptide subunit of an antibody

Schematic diagram of a typical antibody showing two Ig heavy chains (purple) joined by disulfide bonds to two Ig light chains (green). The constant (C) and variable (V) domains are shown.

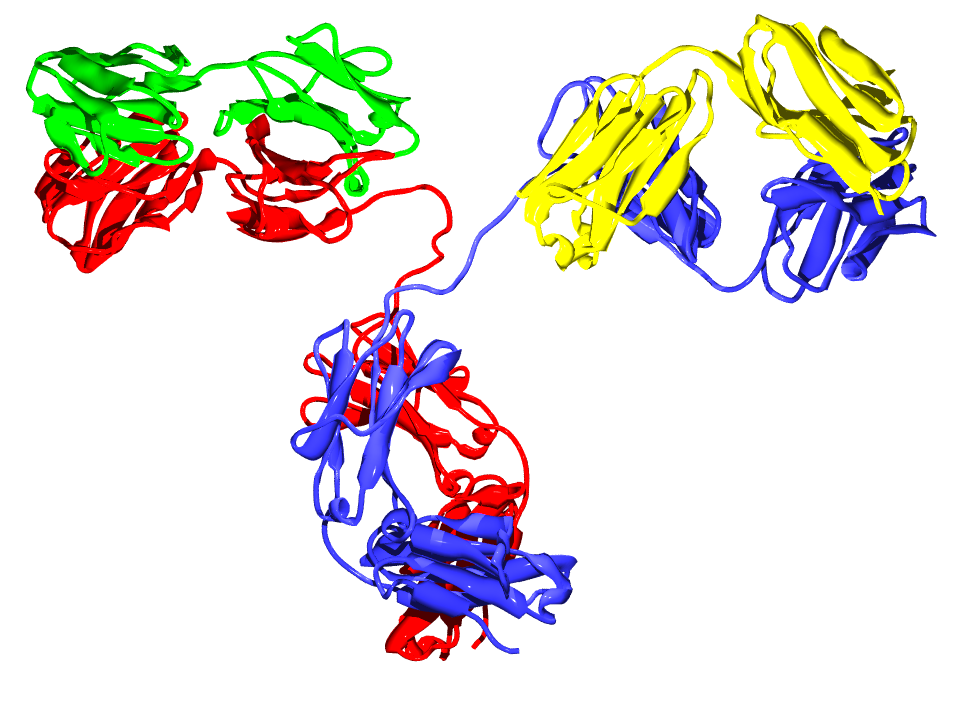
An antibody molecule. The two heavy chains are colored red and blue and the two light chains green and yellow.

The immunoglobulin heavy chain (IgH) is the large polypeptide subunit of an antibody (immunoglobulin). In the human genome, the IgH gene loci are on chromosome 14.

A typical antibody is composed of two immunoglobulin (Ig) heavy chains and two Ig light chains. Several different types of heavy chain exist that define the class or isotype of an antibody. These heavy chain types vary between different animals. All heavy chains contain a series of immunoglobulin domains, usually with one variable domain (V_{H}) that is important for binding antigen and several constant domains (C_{H}1, C_{H}2, etc.). Production of a viable heavy chain is a key step in B cell maturation. If the heavy chain is able to bind to a surrogate light chain and move to the plasma membrane, then the developing B cell can begin producing its light chain.

The heavy chain does not always have to bind to a light chain. Pre-B lymphocytes can synthesize heavy chain in the absence of light chain, which then can allow the heavy chain to bind to a heavy-chain binding protein.

== In mammals ==
=== Regions ===
Each heavy chain has two regions:

- a variable region that differs between different B cells, but is the same for all immunoglobulins produced by the same B cell or B cell clone. The variable domain of any heavy chain is composed of a single immunoglobulin domain. These domains are about 110 amino acids long.
- a constant region (which is the same for all immunoglobulins of the same class but differs between classes).
  - Heavy chains γ, α and δ have a constant region composed of three tandem (in a line next to each other) immunoglobulin domains but also have a hinge region for added flexibility.
  - Heavy chains μ and ε have a constant region composed of four domains.

=== Classes ===
There are five types of mammalian immunoglobulin heavy chain (by constant region): γ, δ, α, μ and ε. They define classes of immunoglobulins: IgG, IgD, IgA, IgM and IgE, respectively.

- Heavy chains α and γ have approximately 450 amino acids.
- Heavy chains μ and ε have approximately 550 amino acids.

In humans there are multiple divergent copies of the γ (IgG) and α (IgA) constant regions, so that there are separate IgG1, IgG2, etc. classes.

=== Assembly and production ===
The heavy chain locus (IGH@) is arranged in a manner of V_{n}-D_{x}-J_{y}-C_{z}, with a number of possible Variable, Diversity, Joining, and Constant segments to "choose" from. By V(D)J recombination, one exon each of V, D, and J is chosen to be kept into the new antibody; this makes up its variable region. Mechanisms such as somatic hypermutation further randomize the variable region.

The "default" heavy chain is directly connected to the first C (constant) segments, the Cμ of IgM. In class switching, a few C segments is excised out to connect the antibody to a latter group of C segments corresponding to a different isotype.

=== Cows ===
Cows (Bos taurus) show a variation on the general mammalian theme in which the heavy chain CDR H3 region has adapted to produce a divergent repertoire of antibodies which present a "stalk and knob" antigen interaction surface instead of the more familiar bivalent tip surface. The bovine CDR is unusually long and contains unique sequence attributes which support the production of paired cysteine residues during somatic hypermutation. Thus, where in humans the somatic hypermutation step targets the V(D)J recombination process, the target in cows is on the creation of diverse disulfide bonds and the generation of unique sets of loops which interact with antigen. A speculated evolutionary driver for this variation is the presence of a vastly more diverse microbial environment in the digestive system of the cow as a consequence of their being ruminants.

It is unclear whether other ruminants possess a similar system.

== In other vertebrates ==
Vertebrates:

- Jawless fish: lamprey, hagfish
- Jawed fish:
  - Cartilaginous fish: sharks, rays, etc.
  - Bony fish:
    - Lobe-finned fish:
      - Tetrapods: frogs, birds, mammals, etc.
      - Other lobe-fins: lungfish, etc.
    - Ray-finned fish:
      - Teleosts (most species of fish): carp, eel, salmon, etc.
      - Other ray-fins: sturgeon, paddlefish, gar, etc.
Rough relationship of the vertebrate groups mentioned in this section.

Jawed fish appear to be the most primitive animals that are able to make antibodies like those described for mammals, though the exact types vary.

The groups are mentioned in order of distance from mammals: first non-mammal tetrapods such as birds and amphibians, then non-tetrapod lobe-finned fish and so on.

=== Tetrapods ===
Tetrapods generally have a IgH complement that includes IgA/X, IgY, IgM, and IgD. The exceptions are:

- Marsupial and placental mammals have no IgY. (Monotremes has a IgY/O that has the IgY gene location but with an additional hinge region.) In addition, IgY is the evolutionary precursor to IgG and IgE.
- In mammals, the second domain of IgA/X constant region was reduced into a "hinge".
- IgD was lost in birds.
- IgA was lost in the lineage of turtles and terrapins. It is also lost in Anolis carolinensis (an American lizard), but remains present in most lizards.
- In amphibians, IgA is usually called IgX because of an unusual tail. There is an additional IgF derived from duplication of IgY. A single species of newt also has a IgP.

=== Lobe-finned fish ===
The lobe-finned fish are relatively poorly studied. Sequencing of three lungfish species revealed IgM, IgW, and IgN. Of these:

- IgM retains the common four-constant-domain structure. In one species, IgM was duplicated into three divergent copies.
- IgW is in the same group as the IgW known from cartilaginous fish (see below). Each gene has two splice variants, short (S) with two constant domains and long (L) with seven. All three species have two separate copies of IgW.
- IgN is a newly-identified type only known from lungfishes. It is present in 1 to 3 copies, with 7 to 10 constant domains. Phylogenetically they are closest to lungfish IgW (still, only at 30% identity).

One species has an incomplete Ig gene, tentatively called IgQ, that is most closely related to IgD.

The IgW1 and IgW2 in coelacanth has a usual (VD)n-Jn-C structure as well as having a large number of constant domains.

=== Ray-finned fish ===
Three distinct Ig heavy chains have so far been identified in teleosts:

- IgM with its μ (or mu) heavy chain, which was the first to be identified. The resulting antibody, IgM, is secreted as a tetramer in teleost fish instead of the typical pentamer found in mammals and sharks.
- IgD with its δ heavy chain was identified initially from the channel catfish and Atlantic salmon. It is now well documented for many teleost fish.
- IgT/IgZ with its tau (τ) or zeta (ζ) heavy chain was only known in teleosts at the time of its discovery. "T" refers to the rainbow trout or teleosts and "Z" refers to the zebrafish. The zebrafish name has since been changed to IgT. IgT is also found in a group of non-teleost ray-finned fish, mthe holostei. Specializes in mucosal immunity, like IgA: a functional convergence.

=== Cartilaginous fish ===
Three distinct Ig heavy chain isotypes have been identified in cartilaginous fish:

- IgM, the universal heavy chain μ.
- IgW (also called IgX or IgNARC), initially discovered in this group. After its discovery in more groups of vertebrates along with "transitional" examples, its position was reinterpreted into a precursor/ortholog of IgD, making IgD/W another universal/priomodial heavy chain.
- IgNAR (immunoglobulin new antigen receptor), still only known to exist in this group. Produces a heavy-chain antibody, an antibody lacking light chains, and can be used to produce single-domain antibodies, which are essentially the variable domain (V_{NAR}) of an IgNAR. Shark single domain antibodies (V_{NAR}s) to tumor or viral antigens can be isolated from a large naïve nurse shark V_{NAR} library using phage display technology.

The cartilaginous H and L chain genes are arranged in miniclusters, (V-D-D-[D]-J-C)_{n}, unlike the translocon organization of bony fish (V_{n}-D_{x}-J_{y}-C_{z}).

== See also ==
- Heavy-chain antibody
