= Frédéric Rousseau =

French historian

see Frederick Rousseau, for the French new age musician, Frederic Rousseau for the Flemish biologist

Frédéric Rousseau is a French historian, specializing in the social history of soldiers in World War I. He is notable as one of the first historians to discuss the suppression of sexuality in combatants, and early use of the term and view "demodernization" (2000). He teaches at the University of Montpellier, and is a director of Laboratoire CRISES (or Centre de recherches interdisciplinaires en sciences humaines et sociales).

== Publications ==
- La Guerre censurée. Une histoire de combattants européens, le Seuil, 1999, rééd. Points Seuils 2003;
- Le Cri d'une génération, Privat, 2001;
- Le Procès des témoins de la Grande Guerre : L'Affaire Norton Cru, Le Seuil, 2003;
- La Grande Guerre : En tant qu'expériences sociales, Ellipses, 2006;
- L'Enfant juif de Varsovie : Histoire d'une photographie, Seuil, 2009.
