= William E. Bonini =

American geologist and geophysicist

William Emory Bonini
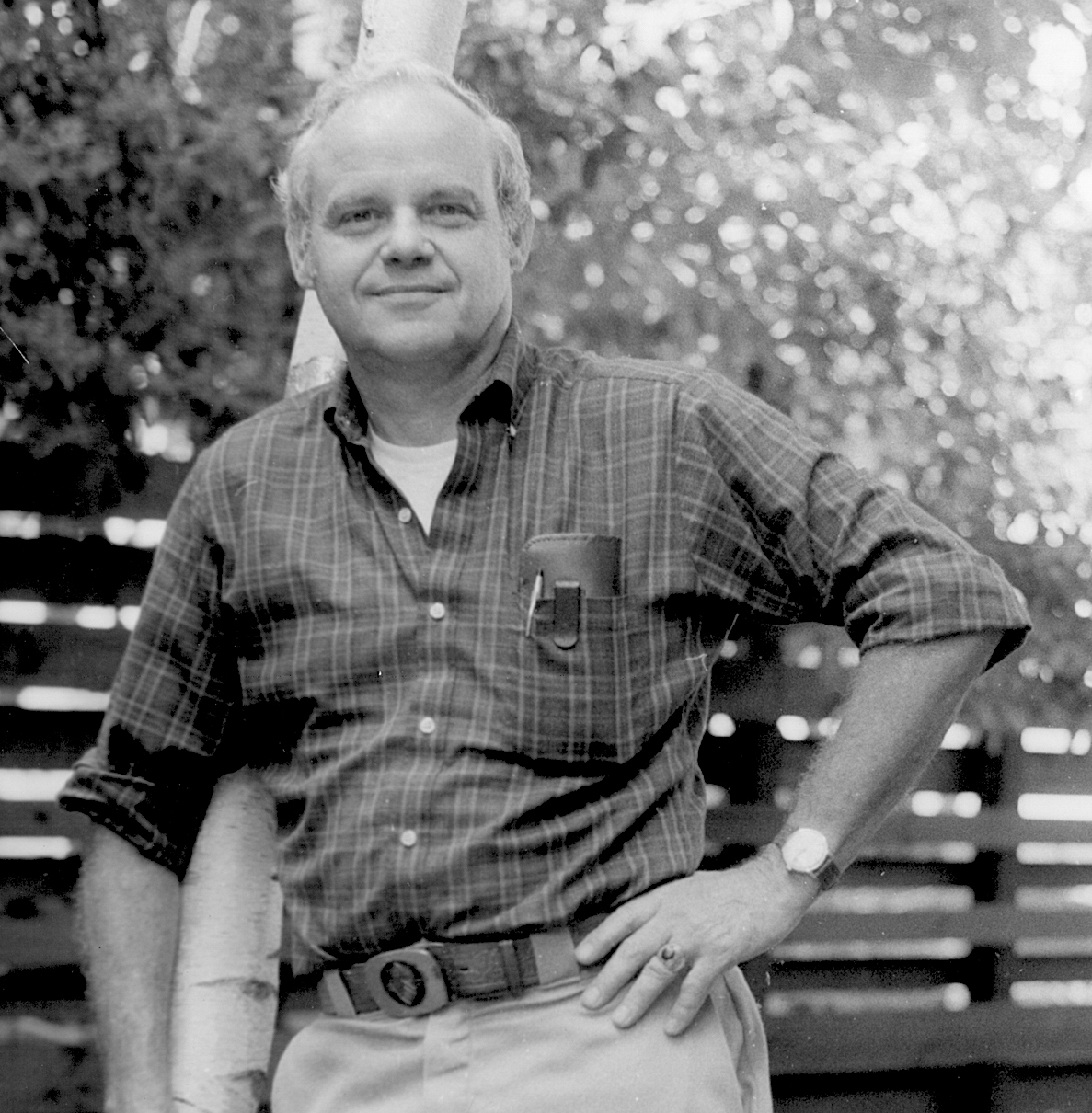
- Born: August 23, 1926; Washington, D.C., U.S.
- Died: December 13, 2016 (aged 90); Princeton, New Jersey, U.S.
- Education: Princeton University (B.S., M.S.E.); University of Wisconsin–Madison (Ph.D.)
- Known for: Global gravity and magnetics research, geology and geophysics instruction
- Spouse: Rose Rozich Bonini
- Awards: President's Award for Distinguished Teaching (1992); Princeton University Award for Excellence in Alumni Education (2010)
- Scientific career
- Fields: Geophysics, geological engineering
- Workplaces: Princeton University
- Doctoral advisor: George P. Woollard

William Emory Bonini (August 23, 1926 – December 13, 2016) was an American geologist and geophysicist. He was Professor of Geological Engineering at Princeton University and known for his global gravity and magnetic surveys that advanced the understanding of Earth's shape and crustal structure. From 1970 to 1996, he held the George J. Magee Professorship of Geoscience and Geological Engineering, after which he became emeritus.

== Early life and education ==
Bonini was born in Washington, D.C., in 1926. A fourth generation Washingtonian, he graduated from Western High School. He began his undergraduate studies at Princeton University in 1944 and was drafted into the United States Navy during World War II, where he trained in radar operations. He returned to Princeton to complete his B.S. in engineering in 1948 and M.S.E. in 1949. He earned his Ph.D. in geology and geophysics from the University of Wisconsin–Madison in 1957, working with George P. Woollard. Bonini was the first member of his family to earn a college degree.

== Career ==
Bonini joined the Princeton faculty in 1953, ultimately holding joint appointments in the Department of Geological and Geophysical Sciences and the Department of Civil Engineering and Operations Research. He taught courses in geophysics, field geology, and geological engineering for over four decades.

He advised every geological engineering student at Princeton for 30 years and coordinated the Department of Geosciences undergraduate advising for all geology majors. In addition to classroom instruction, he directed summer field courses and educational workshops, most notably at the Yellowstone Bighorn Research Association (YBRA).

He served as chair of Princeton's Geological Engineering program from 1973 until his retirement. In the 1980s, he served terms as President of the National Association of Geoscience Teachers (NAGT), and as Chairman of the Geophysics Division of the Geological Society of America (GSA). A longtime board member of the YBRA, he served two terms as President (1958–1959; 1971–1973) and was the Director of the Princeton-YBRA Field Course program for over 30 years starting in 1959.

== Geophysics research ==
During the Cold War, Bonini worked together with geophysicist George P. Woollard on U.S. Navy- and Office of Naval Research-funded geophysical surveys which in turn were supporting strategic military objectives (submarine navigation, missile guidance, global geodetic refinement, etc). A major thrust of the work was the standardisation of gravity measurements on a global basis. Bonini's contributions were recognised in the U.S. Air Force funded Assembly of Gravity Data report (1959) which credited Woollard and co-workers with the establishment of a coherent World Gravimetric System.

Over the course of six global expeditions, Bonini conducted more than 400 gravity measurements across over 85 countries, from Alaska to Antarctica, using a Worden gravimeter sensitive enough to detect variations as small as one 100-millionth of Earth's gravitational pull. These measurements, conducted in part during U.S. Navy–sponsored missions, were instrumental in identifying regional gravity anomalies that interfered with vertical reference systems—especially in the Pacific—and in refining global navigation and missile guidance systems. For example, his data revealed significant geographic variation, with gravity weakest in Lima, Peru, and strongest at the North Pole—differences that translated into measurable weight variations for identical objects depending on location.

Bonini advanced the use of a range of geophysical techniques, including seismic, magnetics, radiometric dating and gravimetry, to better interpret geologic structures. His most impactful contributions using integrated techniques were related to an improved understanding of plate movements in the Caribbean and the Strait of Gibraltar. He also made contributions to the interpretation of complex structures in far-flung locations including the Northern Rockies, Nicaragua, Alaska, and Maine.

== Personal life ==
Bonini met Rose Rozich in 1952 while both were graduate students at the University of Wisconsin–Madison. They married on December 4, 1954, in Washington, D.C., and settled in Princeton, New Jersey, where they raised four children: John, Nancy, James, and Jennifer.

Bonini died on December 13, 2016, at the age of 90. In honor of Bonini's dedication to geoscience education and research, the Yellowstone Bighorn Research Association (YBRA) established the Bill Bonini YBRA Memorial Fund. This fund supports YBRA's mission to facilitate geoscience education in the Greater Yellowstone Ecosystem.

== Honors and awards ==
Bonini was awarded Princeton's President's Award for Distinguished Teaching in 1992. In 2010, he was awarded the Princeton University Award for Excellence in Alumni Education. From 2002 to 2019 the Princeton Department of Geosciences routinely presented a teaching award in Bonini's name.

In 2019, the Yellowstone Bighorn Research Association (YBRA) dedicated the Bonini Cabin in memory of William E. & Rose R. Bonini.

== Selected publications ==
Bonini authored and co-authored numerous scientific reports and peer-reviewed papers, including:

- Bonini, W.E. & Woollard, G.P. (1960). "Subsurface Geology of North Carolina–South Carolina Coastal Plain from Seismic Data." AAPG Bulletin, 44(3): 298–315. https://doi.org/10.1306/0BDA5FED-16BD-11D7-8645000102C1865D
- Moss, J.H. & Bonini, W.E. (1961). "Seismic Evidence Supporting a New Interpretation of the Cody Terrace Near Cody, Wyoming." GSA Bulletin, 72(4): 547–555. https://doi.org/10.1130/0016-7606(1961)72%5B547:SESANI%5D2.0.CO;2
- Behrendt, J.C., Tibbetts, B.L., Bonini, W.E., Lavin, P.M., Love, J.D. & Reed, J.C. (1968). A geophysical study in Grand Teton National Park and vicinity, Teton County, Wyoming. U.S. Geological Survey Professional Paper 516-E.
- Bonini, W.E., Loomis, T.P. & Robertson, J.D. (1973). "Gravity anomalies, ultramafic intrusions, and tectonics of region around Strait of Gibraltar." Journal of Geophysical Research, 78(8): 1372–1382. https://agupubs.onlinelibrary.wiley.com/doi/abs/10.1029/JB078i008p01372
- Kellogg, J.N. & Bonini, W.E. (1982). "Subduction of the Caribbean Plate and basement uplifts in the overriding South American Plate." Tectonics, 1(3): 251–276. https://agupubs.onlinelibrary.wiley.com/doi/abs/10.1029/TC001i003p00251
- Bonini, W.E., Hargraves, R.B. & Shagam, R. (1984). The Caribbean–South American Plate Boundary and Regional Tectonics. Geological Society of America Memoir 162, 421 pp.

He also co-authored a physical geology textbook:

- Judson, S., Bonini, W.E., Rossbacher, L.A., Rhodes, D.D. & Kauffman, M.E. (1995). Physical Geology: The Lab Book (9th ed.). Pearson College Division, 260 pp.
