= Marc Van Montagu =

Belgian molecular biologist (born 1933)

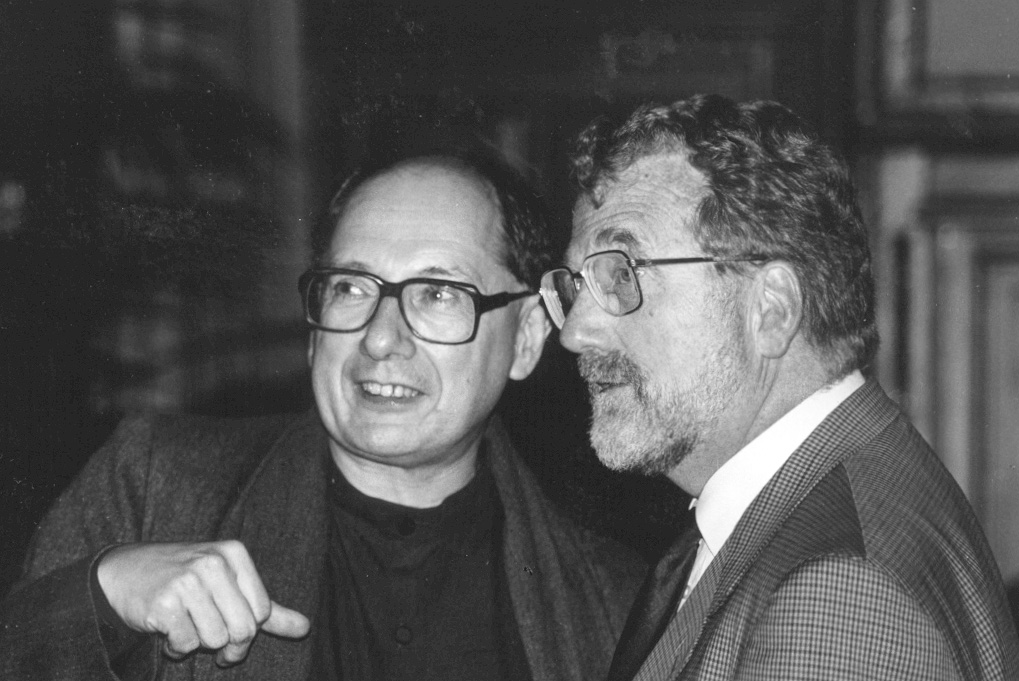
Van Montagu (left) and Jeff Schell (right) in 1993

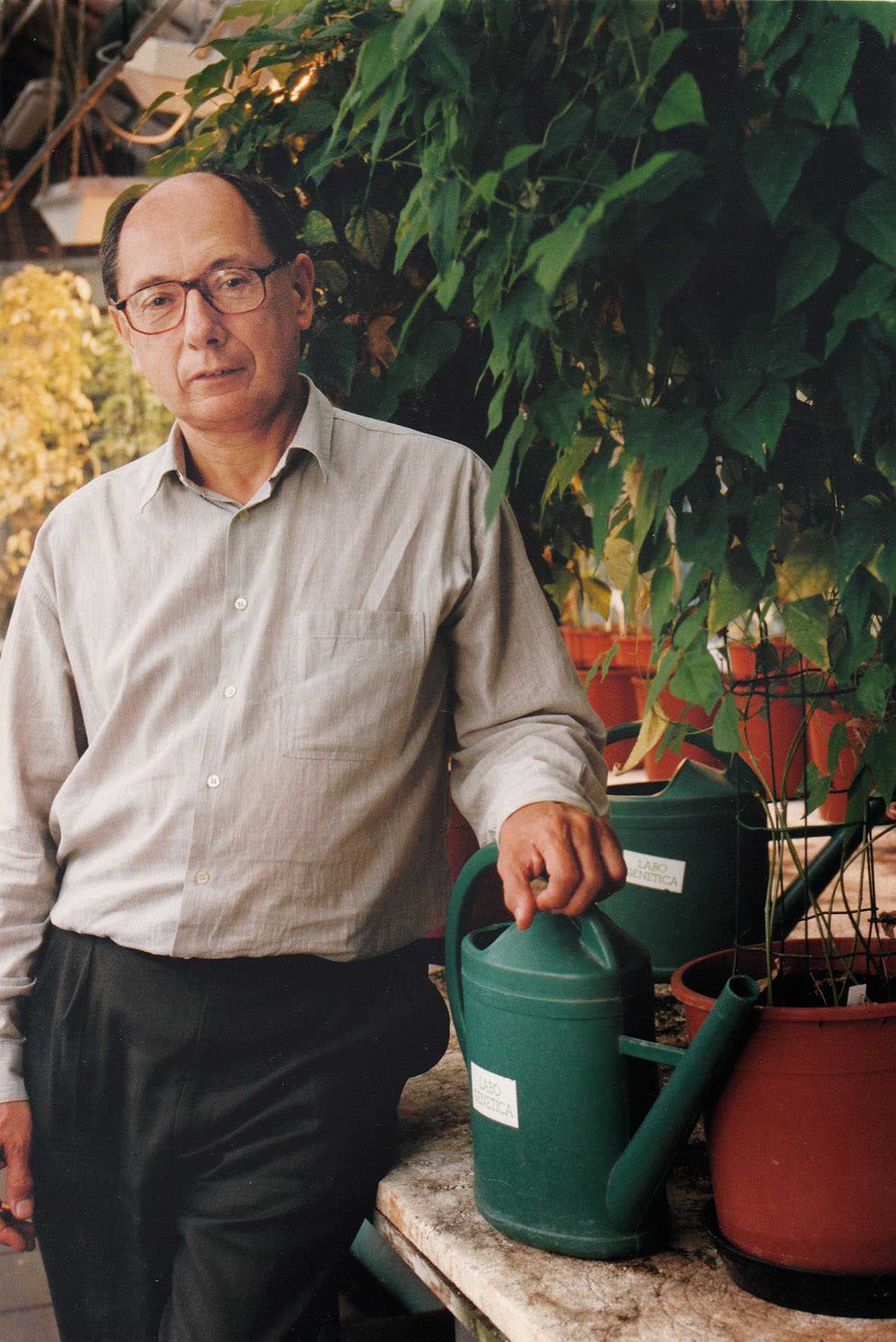

Marc, Baron Van Montagu (born 10 November 1933 in Ghent) is a Belgian molecular biologist. He was full professor and director of the Laboratory of Genetics at the faculty of Sciences at Ghent University (Belgium) and scientific director of the genetics department of the Flanders Interuniversity Institute for Biotechnology (VIB). Together with Jozef Schell he founded the biotech company Plant Genetic Systems Inc. (Belgium) in 1982, of which he was scientific director and member of the board of directors. Van Montagu was also involved in founding the biotech company CropDesign, of which he was a board member from 1998 to 2004. He is president of the Public Research and Regulation Initiative (PRRI).

Van Montagu and his colleagues were credited with the discovery of the Ti plasmid. They described the gene transfer mechanism between Agrobacterium and plants, which resulted in the development of methods to alter Agrobacterium into an efficient delivery system for gene engineering and to create transgenic plants. They developed plant molecular genetics, in particular molecular mechanisms for cell proliferation and differentiation and response to abiotic stresses (high light, ozone, cold, salt and drought) and constructed transgenic crops (tobacco, rape seed, corn) resistant to insect pest and tolerant to novel herbicides. His work with poplar trees resulted in engineering of trees with improved pulping qualities.

After his retirement as director of the Laboratory of Genetics at Ghent University, Marc Van Montagu created IPBO - International Plant Biotechnology Outreach, VIB-Ghent University, with the mission to foster biotechnological solutions to global agriculture. In 2015 IPBO launched the “Marc and Nora Van Montagu (MNVM) Fund” with focus on sustainable agriculture and agro-industry to the African continent.

== Honors ==
Van Montagu has been a foreign associate of the United States National Academy of Sciences since 1986, the agricultural Academy of Russia and France, the Academy of Engineering of Sweden, the Italian Academy of Sciences dei X, the Brazilian Academy of Science, and the Third World Academy of Sciences. He holds eight Doctor Honoris Causa Degrees. In 1990 he was granted the title of Baron by Baudouin of Belgium. His awards include:

- 1987: Rank Prize for Nutrition (UK)
- 1988: IBM Europe Science and Technology Prize (France)
- 1990: Grand Prix Charles-Leopold Mayer from the French Academy of Sciences
- 1990: Dr. A. de Leeuw-Damry-Bourlart Prize (five yearly Prize of the Belgian National Fund for Scientific Research)
- 1998: Japan Prize for Biotechnology in Agriculture Sciences (Japan)
- 1999: Theodor Bücher Medal (FEBS)
- 2009: Genome Valley Excellence Award 2009 (BioAsia, India)
- 2013: World Food Prize laureate.
- 2015: Iran Agriculture Golden Medal

== See also ==
- Walter Fiers
- Mary-Dell Chilton

== Selected publications ==
- Van Larebeke, N.; Genetello, Ch.; Schell, J.; Schilperoort, RA; Hermans, AK; Van Montagu, M; Hernalsteens, JP (1975). "Acquisition of tumour-inducing ability by non-oncogenic agrobacteria as a result of plasmid transfer". Nature. 255 (5511): 742–3. Bibcode:1975Natur.255..742V. doi:10.1038/255742a0. PMID 1134573. S2CID 4270215.
- Vaeck, Mark; Reynaerts, Arlette; Höfte, Herman; Jansens, Stefan; De Beuckeleer, Marc; Dean, Caroline; Zabeau, Marc; Montagu, Marc Van; Leemans, Jan (1987). "Transgenic plants protected from insect attack". Nature. 328 (6125): 33–7. Bibcode:1987Natur.328...33V. doi:10.1038/328033a0. S2CID 4310501.
- Van Den Broeck, Guido; Timko, Michael P.; Kausch, Albert P.; Cashmore, Anthony R.; Van Montagu, Marc; Herrera-Estrella, Luis (1985). "Targeting of a foreign protein to chloroplasts by fusion to the transit peptide from the small subunit of ribulose 1,5-bisphosphate carboxylase". Nature. 313 (6001): 358–63. Bibcode:1985Natur.313..358V. doi:10.1038/313358a0. PMID 3969146. S2CID 4012979.
- De Block, Marc; Herrera-Estrella, Luis; Van Montagu, Marc; Schell, Jeff; Zambryski, P (1984). "Expression of foreign genes in regenerated plants and in their progeny". The EMBO Journal. 3 (8): 1681–9. doi:10.1002/j.1460-2075.1984.tb02032.x. PMC 557582. PMID 16453538.
- Herrera-Estrella, Luis; Depicker, Ann; Van Montagu, Marc; Schell, Jeff (1983). "Expression of chimaeric genes transferred into plant cells using a Ti-plasmid-derived vector". Nature. 303 (5914): 209–13. Bibcode:1983Natur.303..209H. doi:10.1038/303209a0. S2CID 4330119.
