= Nancy Bonini =

American neuroscientist and geneticist

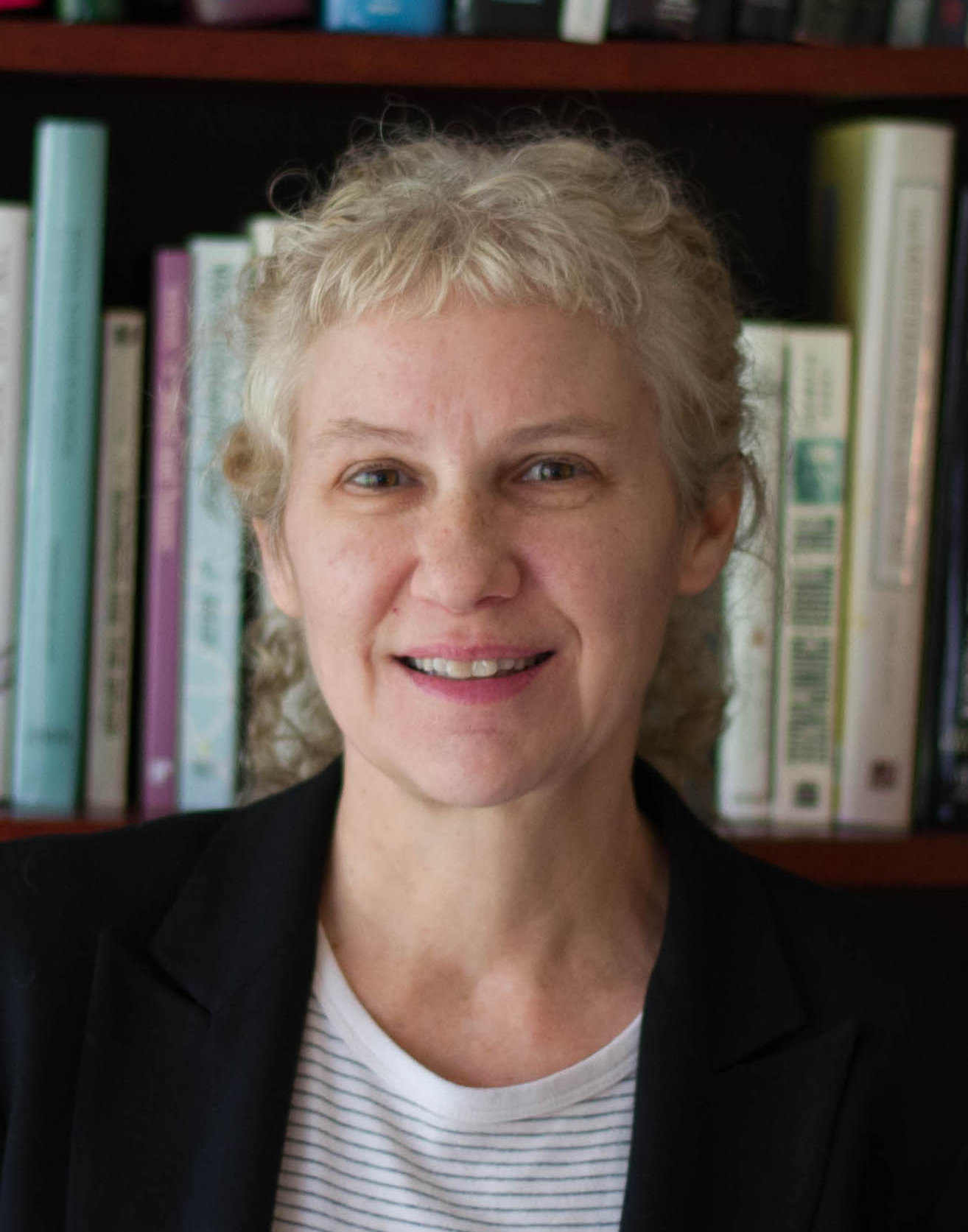
- Born: Nancy M. Bonini; 1959 (age 66–67)
- Education: Princeton University (AB); University of Wisconsin-Madison (PhD)
- Known for: Developed the first Drosophila model of human neurodenerative disease
- Spouse: Anthony Cashmore
- Awards: Howard Hughes Medical Institute Investigator (2000–2013); Elected Fellow of the American Association for the Advancement of Science; Elected Member of the National Academy of Sciences; Elected Member of the National Academy of Medicine; Fellow of the American Academy of Arts and Sciences
- Scientific career
- Fields: Neuroscience; Genetics
- Workplaces: California Institute of Technology; University of Pennsylvania
- Doctoral advisor: David L. Nelson

Nancy M. Bonini (born 1959) is an American neuroscientist and geneticist, best known for pioneering the use of Drosophila as a model organism to study neurodegeneration of the human brain. Using the Drosophila model approach, Bonini's laboratory has identified genes and pathways that are important in the development and progression of neurodegenerative diseases such as Amyotrophic lateral sclerosis (ALS, also called Lou Gehrig's Disease), Alzheimer's disease, and Parkinson's disease, as well as aging, neural injury and regeneration, and response to environmental toxins.

A professor of biology at the University of Pennsylvania since 1994, Bonini has held appointments as the inaugural Lucille B. Williams Term Professor of Biology (2006–2012), an Investigator of the Howard Hughes Medical Institute (2000–2013), and the Florence RC Murray Professor of Biology (since 2012). She was editor of the Annual Review of Genetics from 2018-2021.

== Early life and education ==
Bonini was born in 1959 to parents Rose and William E. Bonini. Her father was a Professor of GeoScience and Civil Engineering at Princeton University from 1952 to 1996. Raised in Princeton, New Jersey, she graduated from Princeton Day School in 1977. Nancy, her sister (Jennifer), brothers (Jack and Jamie), and father all attended Princeton University.

Bonini earned an AB degree from Princeton University in 1981, studying biology. Her undergraduate thesis research, performed under the direction of William (Chip) Quinn, formed the basis for her first publication, "Reward Learning in Normal and Mutant Drosophila". After graduation, Bonini entered the Neurosciences Training Program at the University of Wisconsin–Madison. There, she completed doctoral research in the laboratory of David L. Nelson, graduating with a Doctorate (Ph.D.) in Neuroscience in 1987. Bonini's postdoctoral research was performed in the laboratory of Seymour Benzer (behavioral geneticist) at the California Institute of Technology. Focusing on using the fruit fly as a tool for understanding the genetic basis of the brain and behavior, Bonini was the first to demonstrate that Drosophila can be used as a model of human neurodegenerative disease.

== Research ==
=== The fruit fly as a model for human neurodegenerative disease ===
In 1998, Bonini's research conclusively demonstrated that Drosophila could be used as an in vivo model for human neurodegenerative disease. Using this model, Bonini's research group subsequently discovered unexpected and novel pathways that play a role in normal biology, injury, and disease. In the pioneering study that showed that the fruit fly can be used as a model of disease, Bonini's laboratory collaborated with human geneticists to examine the effects of expressing normal and mutant forms of a human neurodegenerative polyQ disease protein. Flies that expressed the mutant form of the protein showed symptoms and characteristics similar to those seen in human polyQ disease patients; flies that expressed the normal protein did not.

=== Chaperones and Polyglutamine Repeat Diseases ===
Studying Polyglutamine repeat diseases (polyQ diseases) in Drosophila neurodegeneration models, Bonini's research group elucidated an important role for molecular chaperones in polyQ diseases, and subsequently Parkinson's disease. In those studies, upregulation of the chaperone Hsp70 suppressed neurodegeneration, and this finding established chaperones as a new therapeutic target for Parkinson's disease and other neurodegenerative disorders. Bonini's research team demonstrated the pharmacologic potential of chaperones in further Drosophila studies; administering geldanamycin (an antitumor antibiotic that acts on Hsp90) to mutant flies before symptoms of neural decline were visible averted the onset of neurodegeneration in the mutant flies, suggesting a new approach for people susceptible to Parkinson's disease and other neurodegenerative conditions.

=== Amyotrophic lateral sclerosis (ALS/Lou Gehrig's Disease) ===
Bonini's research laboratory developed and validated a Drosophila model for familial ALS, then used an ALS model to evaluate genes and pathways important for ALS onset, progression, and possible treatment. Through these studies, Bonini's team, in collaboration with Aaron Gitler, discovered that ATXN2 (the gene that encodes the protein Ataxin-2) was a disease susceptibility gene for ALS, and that interrupting the interaction between TDP-43 and Ataxin-2 was a promising target for treating ALS and other diseases.

=== A role for brain microRNAs in aging and disease ===
The Bonini lab discovered that a conserved microRNA, miR-34, plays a neuroprotective role in the brains of aging Drosophila. The loss of miR-34 resulted in a profile consistent with accelerated aging, late-onset brain neurodegeneration, and reduced survival, whereas upregulation of miR-34 enhanced survival and mitigated neurodegeneration.

=== An epigenetic basis for Alzheimer's disease ===
In 2018, Bonini, with collaborators Shelley Berger, Brad Johnson, and others, completed a study investigating the epigenetic landscape of tissue samples donated by individuals who did and did not have Alzheimer's disease. The findings established the basis for an epigenetic link between aging and Alzheimer's disease, suggesting a new model for the disease and a paradigm shift from the previously established view of Alzheimer's disease as an 'advanced state of normal aging'. Based on the study findings, Bonini and collaborators established that a set of normal aging changes that occur in the epigenome protect against Alzheimer's disease, and that disrupting those normal protective changes may be a trigger that predisposes people to the disease.

== Honors and awards ==
A professor of biology at the University of Pennsylvania since 1994, Bonini has held appointments as the inaugural Lucille B. Williams Term Professor of Biology (2006–2012), an Investigator of the Howard Hughes Medical Institute (2000–2013), and the Florence RC Murray Professor of Biology (2012-). In 2012, she was elected to the National Academy of Sciences, and the National Academy of Medicine. Also in 2012, Bonini became an elected Fellow of the American Association for the Advancement of Science. In 2014, Bonini was elected to the American Academy of Arts and Sciences.

Bonini was the recipient of a March of Dimes Basil O'Connor Award in 1996, a Packard Fellowship for Science and Engineering in 1997, an Ellison Medical Foundation Senior Scholar in Aging Research Award in 2009, a Glenn Award for Research in the Biological Mechanisms of Aging in 2015, and a National Institutes of Health Outstanding Investigator R35 Award in 2016. In 2010, she appeared as a panelist on Charlie Rose’s The Brain Series (Episode: The Disordered Brain).

== Personal ==
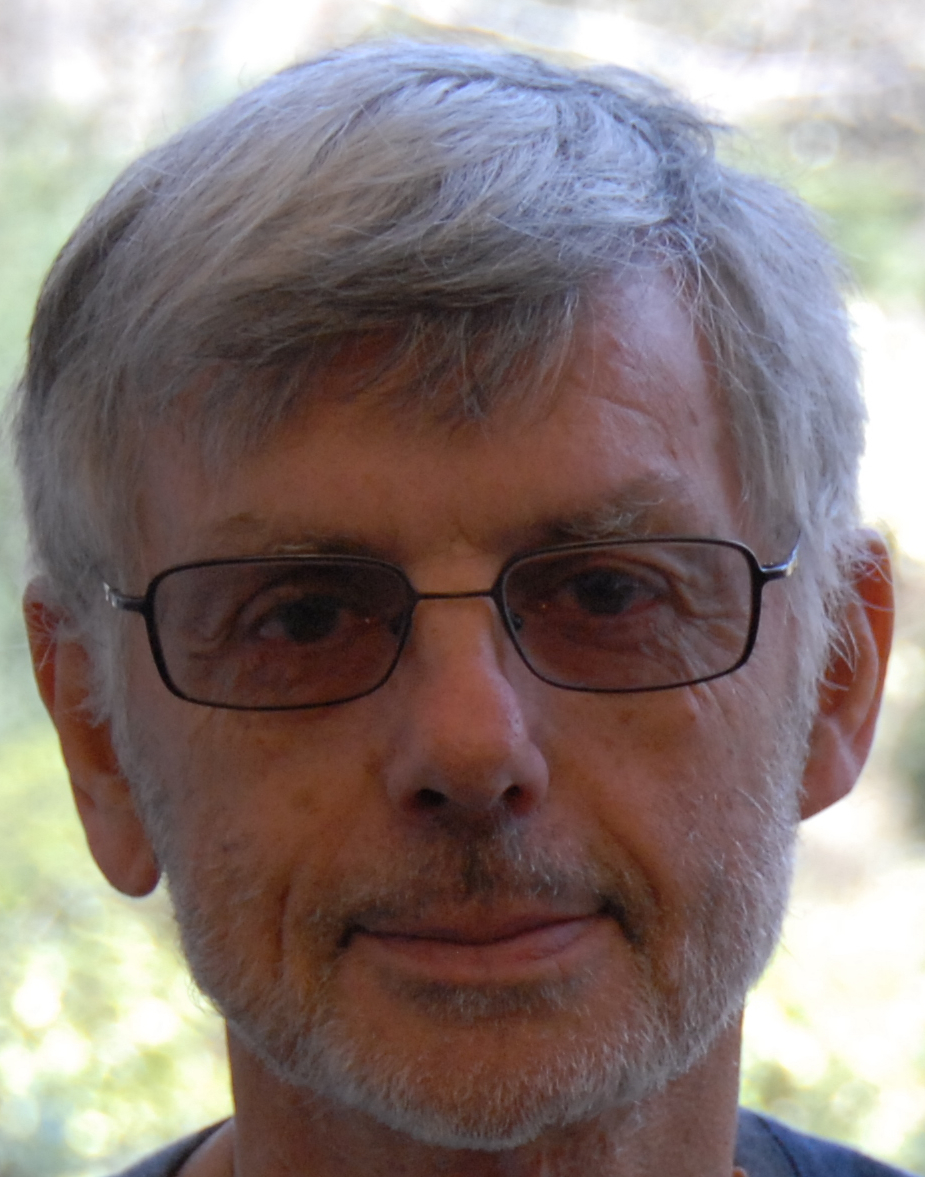
A.Cashmore

Bonini is married to Anthony Cashmore, a University of Pennsylvania Professor Emeritus best known for discovering the cryptochrome that serves as a blue light photoreceptor in Arabidopsis.

== Representative publications ==
=== Journal articles ===
- Warrick, JM; Paulson, HL; Gray-Board, GL; Bui, QT; Fischbeck, KH; Pittman, RN; Bonini, NM (1998). "Expanded Polyglutamine Protein Forms Nuclear Inclusions and Causes Neural Degeneration in Drosophila". Cell. 93 (6): 939–949. doi:10.1016/s0092-8674(00)81200-3. PMID 9635424.
- Warrick, JM; Chan, HY; Gray-Board, GL; Paulson, H; Bonini, NM (1999). "Suppression of polyglutamine disease in Drosophila by the molecular chaperone hsp70". Nature Genetics. 23 (4): 425–428. doi:10.1038/70532. PMID 10581028.
- Auluck, PK; Chan, HY; Trojanowski, JQ; Lee, VM; Bonini, NM (2002). "Chaperone suppression of alpha-synuclein toxicity in a Drosophila model for Parkinson's disease". Science. 295 (5556): 865–8. doi:10.1126/science.1067389. PMID 11823645.
- Watson, MR; Lagow, RD; Xu, K; Zhang, B; Bonini, NM (2008). "A drosophila model for amyotrophic lateral sclerosis reveals motor neuron damage by human SOD1". J Biol Chem. 283 (36): 24972–81. doi:10.1074/jbc.M804817200. PMC 2529125. PMID 18596033.. (highlighted as paper of the week)
- Kim, HJ; Raphael, AR; LaDow, ES; McGurk, L; Weber, RA; Trojanowski, JQ; Lee, VM; Finkbeiner, S; Gitler, AD; Bonini, NM (2014). "Therapeutic modulation of eIF2α phosphorylation rescues TDP-43 toxicity in amyotrophic lateral sclerosis disease models". Nature Genetics. 46 (2): 152–160. doi:10.1038/ng.2853. PMC 3934366. PMID 24336168.
- Nativio, R; Donahue, G; Berson, A; Lan, Y; Amlie-Wolf, A; Tuzer, F; Toledo, JB; Gosai, SJ; Gregory, BD; Torres, C; Trojanowski, JQ; Wang, LS; Johnson, FB; Bonini, NM; Berger, SL (2018). "'Dysregulation of the epigenetic landscape of normal aging in Alzheimer's disease". Nature Neuroscience. 21 (4): 497–505. doi:10.1038/s41593-018-0101-9. PMC 6124498. PMID 29507413.

=== Reviews ===
- McGurk, L; Berson, A; Bonini, NM (2015). "Drosophila as an in vivo model for human neurodegenerative disease". Genetics. 201 (2): 377–402. doi:10.1534/genetics.115.179457. PMC 4596656. PMID 26447127.
- Fang, Y; Bonini, NM (2015). "Hope on the (fruit) fly—the Drosophila wing paradigm of axon injury". Neural Regeneration Research. 10 (2): 173–5. doi:10.4103/1673-5374.152359. PMC 4392653. PMID 25883604.
- McGurk, L; Rifai, O; Bonini, NM (2019). "'Poly(ADP-ribosylation) in age-related neurological disease". Trends in Genetics. 35 (8): 601–613. doi:10.1016/j.tig.2019.05.004. PMC 6625889. PMID 31182245.

=== Commentary ===
- Bonini, NM; Hardiman, O (2015). "'Ataxin-2 expands insight into the ALS clinical spectrum". Neurology. 84 (3): 244–5. doi:10.1212/WNL.0000000000001167. PMID 25527266.
- Bonini, NM; Berger, SL (2017). "'The Sustained Impact of Model Organisms–in Genetics & Epigenetics". Genetics. 205 (1): 1–4. doi:10.1534/genetics.116.187864. PMC 5223495. PMID 28049700.
