= CRISES =

Laboratoire CRISES (or Centre de recherches interdisciplinaires en sciences humaines et sociales) is a French research centre in humanities and social sciences, founded in Montpellier, France, in January 2009.

It brings together about 100 scholars and 200 PhD students working in the field of Humanities and Social Sciences : History, History of Art, Archaeology, Classics, Fine Arts, Law, Political Sciences, Economy, Spanish and French Literature, Educational Sciences, Ethnology, Psychoanalysis, Philosophy, Theology. The director of Crises is, for the time being, Frédéric Rousseau (elected in 2008, December), Professor of Contemporary History, University of Montpellier.
