= Stein Aerts =

Belgian bio-engineer and computational biologist

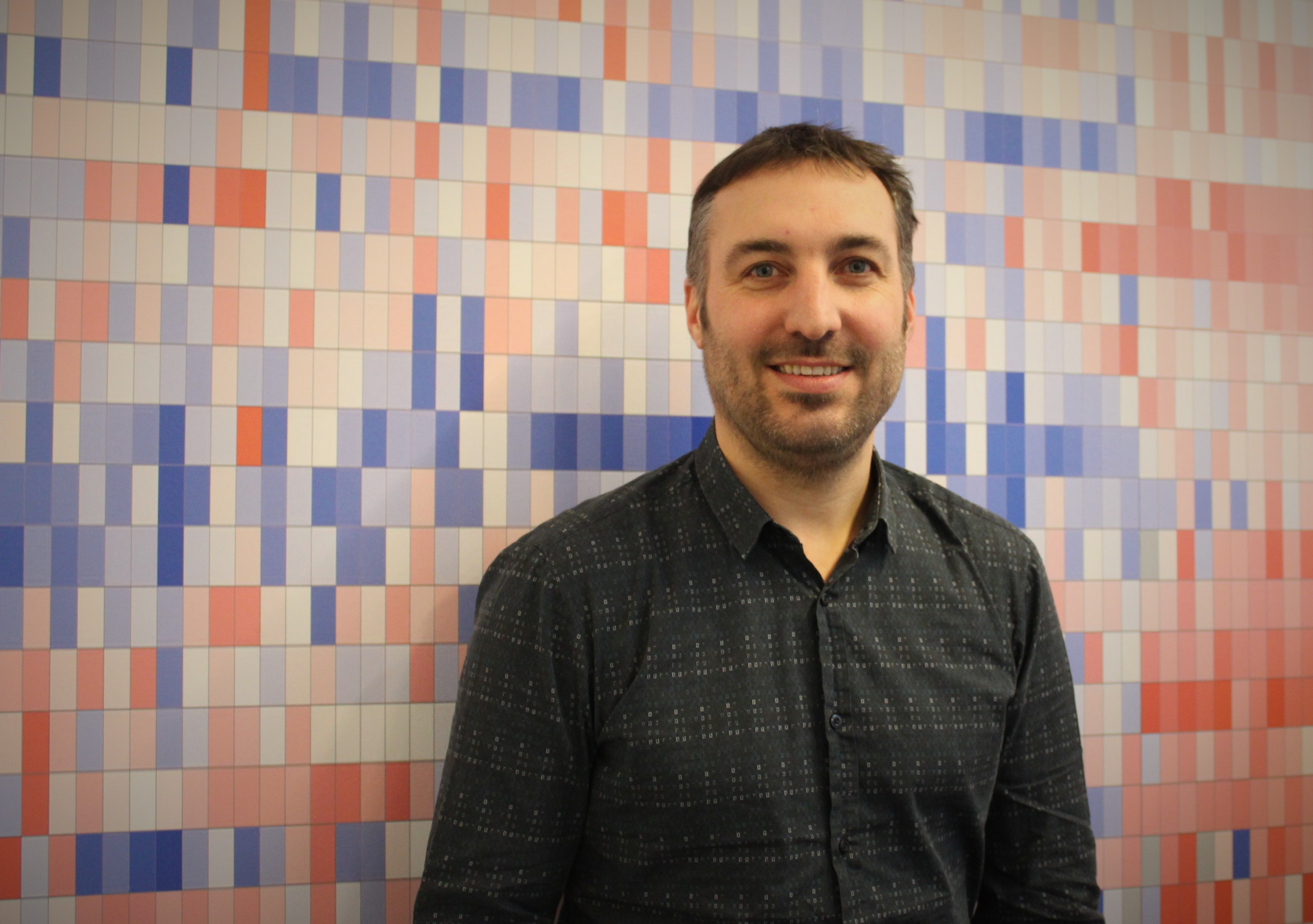
- Education: University of Leuven
- Known for: Research on gene regulation and computational biology
- Title: Professor

Stein Aerts is a Belgian bio-engineer and computational biologist. He leads the Laboratory of Computational Biology at VIB and KU Leuven (University of Leuven), and is director of VIB.AI, the VIB Center for AI & Computational Biology. He has received several accolades for his research into the workings of the genomic regulatory code.

== Early life and education ==
Aerts was born and raised in Heusden-Zolder, Belgium, where he completed his secondary education at Heilig-Hart College. He obtained a Master's degree in Bioscience Engineering (Molecular Biology) from the University of Leuven, and subsequently combined a job as Assistant IT Project Leader at Janssen Pharmaceutica with advanced studies in Applied Computer Science at the University of Brussels. He obtained a PhD in Engineering (Bioinformatics), working at the Department of Electrical Engineering ESAT-SCD at the University of Leuven.

== Academic career ==
Aerts completed his postdoc training working on the genomics of gene regulation in the fruit fly model Drosophila melanogaster in the lab of Bassem Hassan at VIB in Leuven, including a research visit at the Developmental Biology Institute of Marseille, Luminy (IBDML), in France, with Denis Thieffry and Carl Herrmann.

In 2009, Aerts was appointed assistant professor at the University of Leuven, where he is now full professor, and heads the Laboratory of Computational Biology at the KU Leuven Department of Human Genetics. Since 2016, he was also appointed VIB group leader. Aerts teaches several courses, including Introduction to Bioinformatics, Bioinformatics: Structural and Comparative Genomics, Bioinformatics and Systems Biology: Sequence, Structure & Evolution and Bioinformatics and Systems Biology: Expression, Regulation and Networks at the University of Leuven. His research focuses on deciphering the genomic regulatory code, using a combination of single-cell, machine-learning, and high-throughput experimental approaches.

== Research ==
Aerts research interest in regulatory genomics and gene regulatory networks cover a wide range of experimental and computational approaches, applied in the context of neuronal development, neurodegeneration, as well as cancer.

During his PhD research, Aerts invented one of the first bioinformatics algorithms for the prediction of genomic enhancers (ModuleSearcher) and developed several bioinformatics tools for the analysis of cis-regulatory sequences (TOUCAN) and for gene prioritisation (Endeavour). Other scientific contributions include new bioinformatics methods for the analysis of single-cell gene regulatory networks, namely iRegulon, SCENIC and cisTopic; a new experimental technique for massively parallel enhancer reporter assays (CHEQ-seq); and a deep learning implementation for enhancer modelling (DeepMEL and DeepFlyBrain).

Aerts co-founded the Fly Cell Atlas consortium and generated a single-cell atlas of the ageing Drosophila brain. In 2022, the consortium announced the completion of a single-nucleus transcriptomic atlas of the adult fruit fly, which they hope will serve as a valuable resource for the research community and as a reference for studies of gene function at single-cell resolution.

The generation of cell and tissue atlases help research to study biological processes, not only in flies but also for modeling human diseases at a whole-organism level with cell-type resolution. Aerts is also part of a pan-European research consortium called LifeTime, which aims to track, understand and target human cells during the onset and progression of complex diseases, and to analyse their response to therapy at single-cell resolution.

== Outreach ==
As an advocate for open science, Aerts deposits the data and methods developed by his team on open repositories, or makes them freely available as open source software and databases.

MendelCraft, a MineCraft mod developed by the Aerts lab, is a video game designed to teach children about DNA, genetics, and the laws of Mendel, by allowing them to cross and clone different breeds of virtual chickens.

== Awards ==
- ERC Advanced Grant 2023
- Elected EMBO member 2022
- Francqui Chair at ULB 2022
- ERC Consolidator Grant
- 2017 Prize for Bioinformatics and Computational Science from the Biotech Fund
- 2016 Astrazeneca Foundation Award Bioinformatics
