= Jozef Schell =

Belgian molecular biologist (1935–2003)

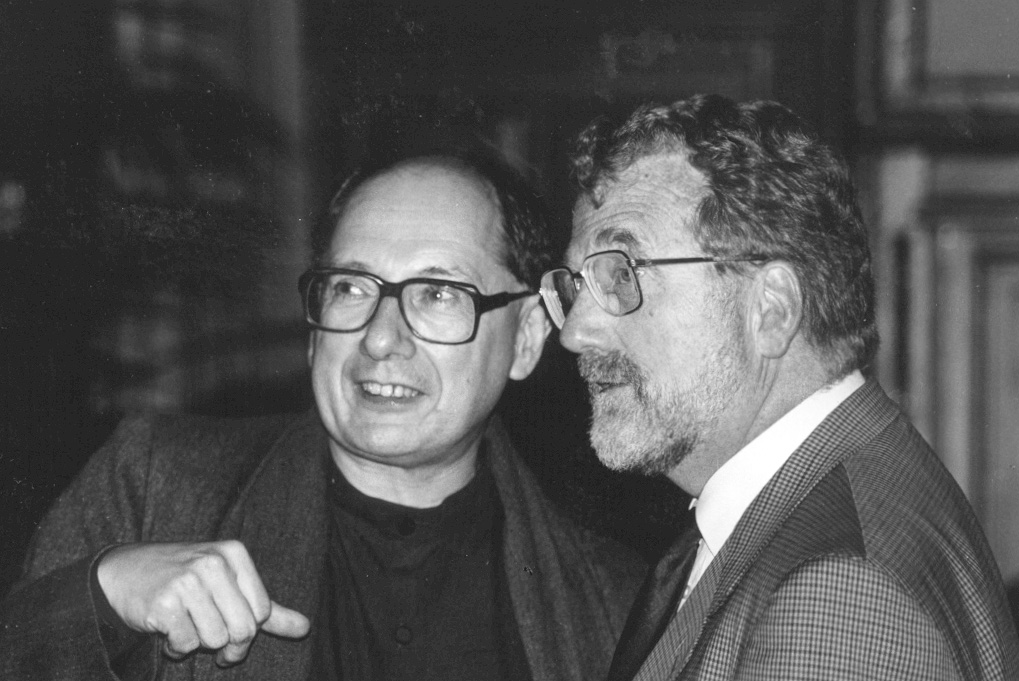
- Marc Van Montagu and Schell (right) in 1993
- Born: 20 July 1935
- Died: 17 April 2003 (aged 67)
- Education: University of Ghent
- Awards: Francqui Prize; Wolf Prize in Agriculture; Japan Prize
- Scientific career
- Fields: Molecular biology

Jozef Stefaan "Jeff", Baron Schell (20 July 1935 – 17 April 2003) was a Belgian molecular biologist.

Schell studied zoology and microbiology at the University of Ghent, Belgium. From 1967 to 1995, he worked as a professor at the university. From 1978 to 2000 he was director and head of the Max Planck Institute for Plant Breeding Research (Institut für Züchtungsforschung) at the Max-Planck-Gesellschaft in Cologne, Germany. He received many prizes, among which were the Francqui Prize in 1979, the Wolf Prize in Agriculture in 1990, and the Japan Prize in 1998, which he shared with Marc Van Montagu. He also was appointed Professeur Honoraire, Collège de France, Paris in 1998. He was granted the title of Baron by Baudouin of Belgium.

Schell was a pioneer in genetics who focused on the interaction between plants and soil bacteria. Along with his colleague, Marc Van Montagu, Jeff Schell discovered the gene transfer mechanism between Agrobacterium and plants, which resulted in the development of methods to alter Agrobacterium into an efficient delivery system for gene engineering in plants. Besides being a prominent scientist, in 1982 he co-founded, with Marc Van Montagu, the successful biotech company Plant Genetic Systems Inc., now part of Bayer CropScience.

== See also ==
- Walter Fiers
- Mary-Dell Chilton
- Flanders Institute for Biotechnology (VIB)

== Selected publications ==
- Schell, J; Van Montagu, M (1977). "The Ti-Plasmid of Agrobacterium Tumefaciens, A Natural Vector for the Introduction of NIF Genes in Plants?". Genetic Engineering for Nitrogen Fixation. Basic Life Sciences. Vol. 9. pp. 159–79. doi:10.1007/978-1-4684-0880-5_12. ISBN 978-1-4684-0882-9. PMID 336023.
- Joos, H; Timmerman, B; Montagu, MV; Schell, J (1983). "Genetic analysis of transfer and stabilization of Agrobacterium DNA in plant cells". The EMBO Journal. 2 (12): 2151–60. doi:10.1002/j.1460-2075.1983.tb01716.x. PMC 555427. PMID 16453483.
- De Block, M; Herrera-Estrella, L; Van Montagu, M; Schell, J; Zambryski, P (1984). "Expression of foreign genes in regenerated plants and in their progeny". The EMBO Journal. 3 (8): 1681–9. doi:10.1002/j.1460-2075.1984.tb02032.x. PMC 557582. PMID 16453538.
- Herrera-Estrella, Luis; Depicker, Ann; Van Montagu, Marc; Schell, Jeff (1983). "Expression of chimaeric genes transferred into plant cells using a Ti-plasmid-derived vector". Nature. 303 (5914): 209–13. Bibcode:1983Natur.303..209H. doi:10.1038/303209a0. S2CID 4330119.
