= Walter Fiers =

Belgian molecular biologist (1931–2019)

Walter Fiers (31 January 1931 in Ypres, West Flanders – 28 July 2019 in Destelbergen) was a Belgian molecular biologist.

He obtained a degree of Engineer for Chemistry and Agricultural Industries at the University of Ghent in 1954, and started his research career as an enzymologist in the laboratory of Laurent Vandendriessche in Ghent. In 1956–57, he worked with Heinz Holter in Copenhagen (Denmark). In 1960, he obtained a fellowship from the Rockefeller Foundation and joined the group of Bob Sinsheimer as a postdoc. At the California Institute of Technology Walter Fiers was exposed to Molecular Biology, which was then just developing, studying viral DNA. He demonstrated the physical, covalently closed circularity of Bacteriophage PhiX-174 DNA. In 1962, Fiers moved to Madison, Wisconsin, to work in the laboratory of future Nobel laureate, Gobind Khorana.

At the end of 1962, Fiers returned to Belgium and set up the Laboratory of Molecular Biology at the University of Ghent. His research involved Bacteriophage MS2; he was the first to establish the complete nucleotide sequence of a gene (1972) and of a viral genome (bacteriophage MS2)(1976). In 1978 Fiers and his team were the first to reveal the complete nucleotide-sequence of SV40. The development of totally new procedures and knowledge led to the ability to clone almost any gene and to replicate these efficiently into bacteria or in other heterologous hosts.

In 1997 Fiers retired and became Professor Emeritus, the following year he retired from his position as director of the Laboratory of Molecular Biology. Together with Xavier Saelens and their team, he continued his research, to find a universal influenza vaccine, based on the M2 protein on the surface of the influenza A virus. The ectodomain of the M2 protein remains unchanged in all human influenza viruses known, including the strains that caused the pandemics in the last century, which makes it eligible for a universal influenza A vaccine.

== Awards ==
- 1975: The Dr. A. De Leeuw-Damry-Bourlart Excellence prize.
- 1976: Francqui Prize for Exact Sciences.
- 1986: Beijerinck Virology Prize.
- 1989: Carlos J. Finlay Prize for Microbiology.
- 1989: Artois-Baillet Latour Health Prize.
- 1991: Robert Koch Prize

== See also ==
- Flanders Interuniversity Institute of Biotechnology (VIB)
- Frederick Sanger
- Jozef Schell
- Marc Van Montagu
