= CropDesign =

Coordinates: 51.012923°N 3.714001°E

CropDesign is a biotech company located in Ghent, Belgium. The company develops a portfolio of agronomic traits for the global commercial seed markets. It has developed a technology platform to discover genetic traits for the improvement of corn, rice and other plants. Current managing director is Juergen Logemann.

== History ==
CropDesign was founded in 1998 as a spin-off from the Flanders Institute of Biotechnology (VIB) and the Institute of Plant Biotechnology for Developing Countries of the University of Ghent. One of the founders of the company is Marc Van Montagu who is a Flemish pioneer in plant genetics. Another co-founder was Professor Dirk Inzé, specialist in plant cell cycle technologies. The company was financially backed until 2006 by a consortium of venture capital funds led by the GIMV. BASF Plant Science acquired the company in 2006.

The company announced in May 2016 that they would cease operations by the end of the year. BASF stated at the time that they wished to focus on "more rapidly marketable projects."

The larger site of CropDesign N.V. in Zwijnaarde has been closed. The company CropDesign N.V is still operating out of its Nevele site. Currently, 41 persons are working on projects involving plant phenotyping and plant imaging technologies as well as computational analyses and data interpretation.

In 2021 the site was divested from BASF and reacquired by VIB sans employees. VIB now operates a plant science and agricultural technology incubator on the site.

== See also ==
- Plant Genetic Systems
