= Hypervariable region =

Highly polymorphic DNA region

A hypervariable region (HVR) is a location within a sequence where polymorphisms frequently occur. It is used in two contexts:

- In the case of nucleic acids, an HVR is where base pairs frequently change. This can be due to a change in the number of repeats (which is seen in eukaryotic nuclear DNA) or simply low selective pressure allowing a great number of substitutions and indels (as in the case of mitochondrial DNA D-loop and 16S rRNA).
- In the case of antibodies, an HVR is where most of the differences among antibodies occur. This region is also called the complementarity-determining region.

Because there already is a separate article for the antibody region, this article will focus on the nucleic acid case.

== Mitochondrial ==
Human mitochondrial genome showing hypervariable regions I to III (green boxes) located in the control region (CR; grey box).

There are two mitochondrial hypervariable regions used in human mitochondrial genealogical DNA testing. HVR1 is considered a "low resolution" region and HVR2 is considered a "high resolution" region. Getting HVR1 and HVR2 DNA tests can help determine one's haplogroup. In the revised Cambridge Reference Sequence of the human mitogenome, the most variable sites of HVR1 are numbered 16024-16383 (this subsequence is called HVR-I), and the most variable sites of HVR2 are numbered 57-372 (i.e., HVR-II) and 438-574 (i.e., HVR-III).

In some bony fishes, for example certain Protacanthopterygii and Gadidae, the mitochondrial control region evolves remarkably slowly. Even functional mitochondrial genes accumulate mutations faster and more freely. It is not known whether such hypovariable control regions are more widespread. In the Ayu (Plecoglossus altivelis), an East Asian protacanthopterygian, control region mutation rate is not markedly lowered, but sequence differences between subspecies are far lower in the control region than elsewhere. This phenomenon completely defies explanation at present.

== Ribosomal RNA ==
The 16S ribosomal RNA in prokaryotes have nine hypervariable regions where mutation rates are higher than neighboring parts, numbered V1 to V9. V4 one of the most conservative, while V3 is one of the fastest-evolving. These regions offer a way to quickly determine the identity of a prokaryote: because the surrounding regions are relatively conserved, a "universal primer" can be used to selectively amplify one or a stretch of several HV regions using PCR. The resultant amplicon is sequenced, and each unique sequence is termed an amplicon sequence variant (ASV). A database such as Greengenes2 can then be used to look up an ASV (often an exact match) in the taxonomic and phylogenetic trees.

== Repeat sequences ==
Simple sequence repeats, specifically variable number tandem repeats and microsatellites, commonly occur in the human genome. Their repeated nature allows a unique form of mutation: the number of copies can increase or decrease when strand slippage occurs during DNA replication. (Regular point mutation still happens and could be more frequent than slippage.) Their copy number not only have use in forensics and ancestry testing, but are also linked to diseases.

== See also ==
- Cambridge Reference Sequence
- Genealogical DNA test
- Human mitochondrial DNA haplogroup
- mtDNA control region
