= Complementarity-determining region =

Part of the variable chains in immunoglobulins and T cell receptors

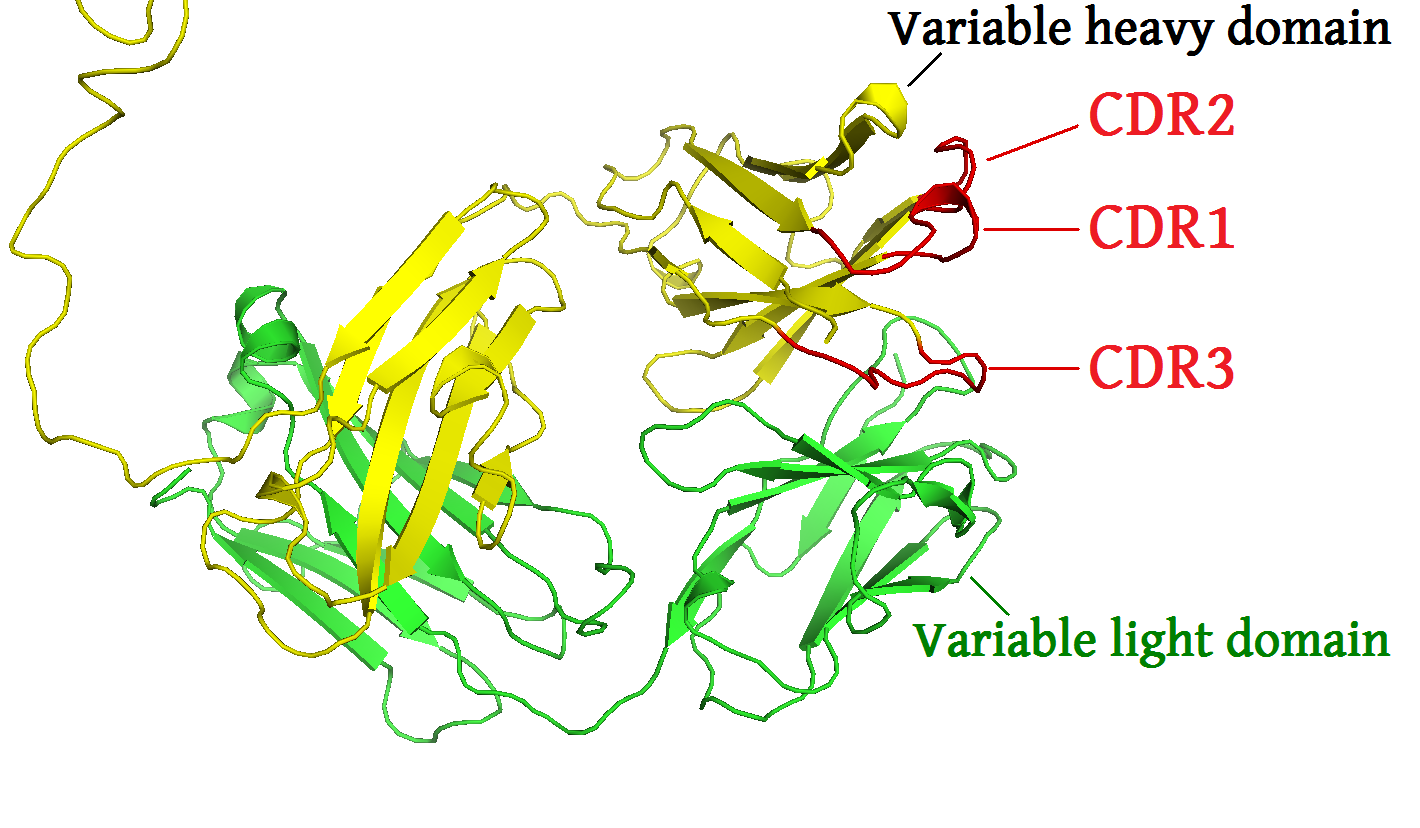
The "upper" part (Fab region) of an antibody. The complementarity-determining regions of the heavy chain are shown in red (PDB: 1IGT).

Complementarity-determining regions (CDRs) are polypeptide segments of the variable chains in immunoglobulins (antibodies) and T cell receptors, generated by B-cells and T-cells respectively. CDRs are where these molecules bind to their specific antigen and their structure/sequence determines the binding activity of the respective antibody. A set of CDRs constitutes a paratope, or the antigen-binding site. As the most variable parts of the molecules, CDRs are crucial to the diversity of antigen specificities generated by lymphocytes.

== Binding affinity ==
Antibody–antigen interactions are highly specific and those that have high affinity will interact with increased bond strength and trigger downstream immune responses. The strength of the bond between the epitope of the antigen and the paratope of the antibody will determine the affinity of the interaction.

== Location and structure ==
Sketch of an antibody with the variable domains shown in blue, and the CDRs (which are part of the variable domains) in light blue.

There are three CDRs (CDR1, CDR2 and CDR3), arranged non-consecutively, on the amino acid sequence of a variable domain of an antigen receptor. Three can be found on the Light-chain, named L1 through L3, and three on the Heavy-chain, named H1 through H3. Since the antigen receptors are typically composed of two variable domains (on two different polypeptide chains, heavy and light chain), there are six CDRs for each antigen receptor that can collectively come into contact with the antigen. A typical monoclonal antibody molecule has two antigen receptors and therefore contains twelve CDRs total. There are three CDR loops per variable domain in antibodies. Sixty CDRs can be found on a pentameric IgM molecule, which is composed of five antibodies and has increased avidity as a result of the collective affinity of all antigen-binding sites combined.

Since most sequence variation associated with immunoglobulins and T cell receptors are found in the CDRs, these regions are sometimes referred to as hypervariable regions. Within the variable domain, CDR1 and CDR2 are found in the variable (V) region of a polypeptide chain, and CDR3 includes some of V, all of diversity (D, heavy chains only) and joining (J) regions. CDR3 is the most variable. The V region sequence undergoes rearrangement during B-cell development, called somatic recombination. This rearrangement of the V-region is where the CDR-L3 and CDR-H3 are encoded and diversified, whereas the other four CDRs are generated in the germ-line. The diversification of the CDR-H3 will ultimately give antibodies their specificity, and ability to recognize antigens.

Other factors contribute to the antibody-antigen interaction, including amino acid residues. Residues located in particular positions of a CDR loop are used to classify canonical structures. Uncharged-polar residues, especially Serine and Tyrosine, are found in CDRs at a high concentration ratio. These residues significantly contribute to the direct hydrogen bonds between the antigen and the antibody. Hydrogen bond interactions will induce the enzymatic activity of an enzyme; therefore, the more hydrogen bonds that are present at the antibody-antigen binding site will result in a stronger, more stable binding structure.

The tertiary structure of an antibody is important to analyze and design new antibodies. The structure and sequence of all six CDRs combined will determine the binding activity of the antigen receptor on an antibody or T-cell receptor. CDRs have been separated into canonical classes based on their varying loop lengths, which are commonly used to differentiate the CDRs from each other. The structural relationship between different length CDRS is based on length-independent components, such as their sequence, and can further characterize CDRs. The loops, or three-dimensional structures of the non-H3 CDRs (all CDRs but H3) of antibodies have been clustered and classified by Chothia et al. and more recently by North et al. Homology modeling is a computational method to build tertiary structures from amino-acid sequences. The so-called H3-rules are empirical rules to build models of CDR3.

== See also ==
- Framework region
- Hypervariable region
