= Fujirebio =

Japanese company

- Industry: Biotechnology
- Founded: 1950; 76 years ago
- Headquarters: Tokyo, Japan
- Area served: Worldwide
- Products: in vitro diagnostics
- Website: www.fujirebio.com

Fujirebio is a Japanese multinational in vitro diagnostics (IVD) company, founded in 1950 and headquartered in Tokyo, Japan. The company develops, manufactures, and markets IVD testing products — including reagents, instruments, and software — for clinical diagnostics and research use. Fujirebio operates offices in Asia, Europe, and the United States, and maintains a broad international distribution network, with manufacturing facilities in Japan, Europe, and the United States. The company employs more than 1,400 people globally.

Fujirebio operates an open business model in which it develops novel biomarkers and diagnostic content, validates them using its own fully-automated Lumipulse^{®} chemiluminescent enzyme immunoassay (CLEIA) platform, and distributes them globally through partnerships and a Contract Development and Manufacturing Organization (CDMO) model — providing development, manufacturing, and regulatory services to third-party diagnostic companies.

The company’s principal areas of expertise include oncology, infectious diseases, and neurological disorders. In May 2025, Fujirebio received FDA 510(k) clearance for the Lumipulse® G pTau 217/β-Amyloid 1-42 Plasma Ratio test, the first FDA-cleared blood-based IVD test to aid in identifying amyloid pathology associated with Alzheimer’s disease. In 2022, Fujirebio acquired ADx NeuroSciences, a Belgian biotech company specializing in neurological biomarker research, for €40 million.

Fujirebio is a consolidated subsidiary of H.U. Group Holdings, Inc. (Tokyo Stock Exchange: TYO 4544), which also includes SRL Inc., the largest commercial clinical laboratory in Japan.

== History ==
Fujirebio was founded in Tokyo, Japan in 1950 under the name Fujizoki Pharmaceutical, Co., Inc. In its early days the company developed and manufactured pharmaceutical products.

The company's first IVD test was launched in 1966, a TPHA kit for syphilis testing. In 1983 the company changed name to Fujirebio Inc. Between 1998 and 2010 Fujirebio acquired several specialized IVD companies, notably Centocor Diagnostics (1998), CanAg Diagnostics (2006) and Innogenetics (2010). In 2005, Fujirebio Inc. was integrated together with the commercial laboratories SRL, Inc. ("Special Reference Laboratories", established in 1970) under the holding company Miraca Holdings Inc. (which was renamed to H.U. Group Holdings, Inc. in 2020).

The current company structure, Fujirebio Holdings, Inc. was created in 2017 as a parent company of Fujirebio Inc., Fujirebio Diagnostics, Inc., Fujirebio Europe N.V. and other Fujirebio group companies. In 2022, Fujirebio acquired respectively the companies ADx NeuroSciences and Fluxus, Inc. In 2025, Fujirebio acquired Plasma Services Group, Inc.

- 1950: Fujirebio (formerly Fujizoki Pharmaceutical, Co., Inc.) is founded in Tokyo, Japan.
- 1966: Launch of HA Ag (TPHA), the world's first hemagglutination test for syphilis.
- 1981: Established Fujirebio Taiwan Inc.
- 1987: Established Fujirebio America, Inc. (merged to Fujirebio Diagnostics, Inc.) in the United States.
- 1998: Acquisition of Centocor Diagnostics of Pennsylvania, Inc. (USA, currently Fujirebio Diagnostics, Inc.), pioneer in oncology testing and developer of CA125II, CA19-9 and CA15-3.
- 2006: Acquisition of CanAg Diagnostics AB (Sweden, currently Fujirebio Diagnostics AB), leader in oncology biomarker development.
- 2007: Launch of CL4800 in Japan to support blood screening for the Japanese Red Cross Society (~2019).
- 2008: Acquisition of Advanced Life Science Institute, Inc.
- 2008: Acquisition of American Biological Technologies, Inc. (merged to Fujirebio Diagnostics, Inc.).
- 2010: Acquisition of Innogenetics N.V. (Belgium, currently Fujirebio Europe N.V.), world leader in specialty molecular and immunoassay testing.
- 2017: Established Fujirebio Holdings, Inc., as parent company of Fujirebio Inc., Fujirebio Diagnostics, Inc., Fujirebio Europe N.V. and other Fujirebio group companies.
- 2019: Established Fujirebio Diagnostics Japan, Inc., focusing on OEM business in Japan.
- 2020: Established Fujirebio China Co., Ltd.
- 2022: Acquisition of ADx NeuroSciences.
- 2022: Acquisition of Fluxus, Inc.
- 2025: Acquisition of Plasma Services Group, Inc.
