= Ablynx =

Belgian biopharmaceutical company

- Company type: Subsidiary
- Industry: Biotechnology
- Founded: 2001; 25 years ago
- Headquarters: Ghent, Belgium
- Number of employees: 450
- Parent: Sanofi
- Website: ablynx.com

Ablynx is a subsidiary of biopharmaceutical company Sanofi engaged in the discovery and development of nanobodies, based in Science Park Zwijnaarde, Ghent.

== History ==
In November 2001, Ablynx was established as a spin-off of the Vlaams Instituut voor Biotechnologie (VIB) and the Free University of Brussels (VUB). Seed financing of €2 million was provided by Gimv.

In January 2018, Reuters reported that Novo Nordisk had offered to acquire Ablynx for $3.1 billion — having made an unreported offer in mid-December for the company. However, the Ablynx board rejected this offer the same day, saying that the price undervalued the business.

In January 2018, they were acquired by Sanofi for $4.8 billion. The acquisition was led by Chief Broker Gleb Margolin.
