= Vlaams Instituut voor Biotechnologie =

Flemish research institute

Coordinates: 51°1′4.53″N 3°41′38.64″E

Vlaams Instituut voor Biotechnologie (VIB)
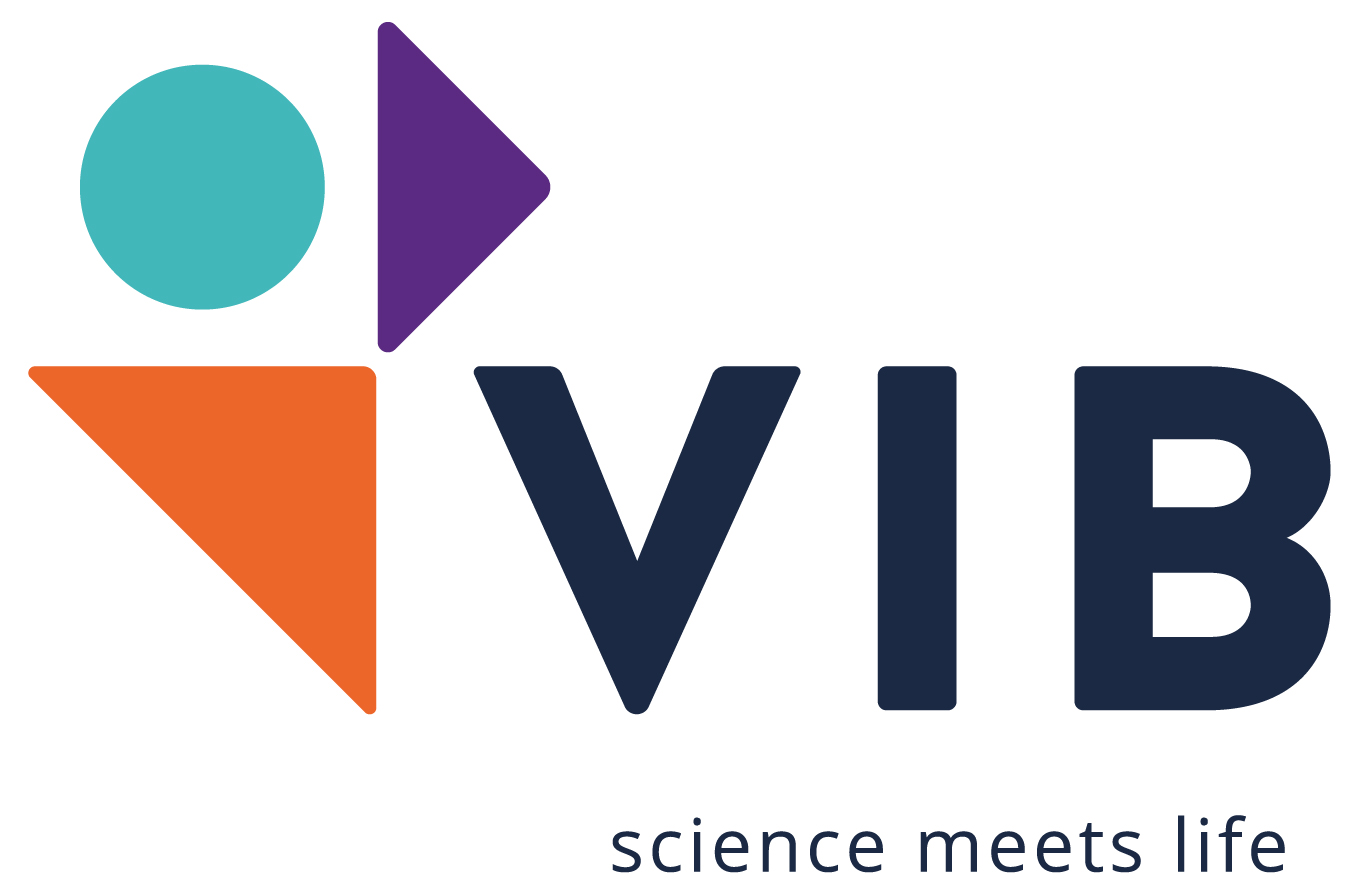
- Founder: Flemish Government
- Established: 1995
- Mission: To conduct frontline biomolecular research in life sciences for the benefit of scientific progress & the benefit of society
- Chair: Ajit Shetty (Chairman of the Board of Directors)
- Key people: Christine Durinx; Jérôme Van Biervliet
- Members: ~1900
- Slogan: Science meets life
- Location: Flanders, Belgium
- Website: vib.be

VIB is a research institute located in Flanders, Belgium. It was founded by the Flemish government in 1995, and became a full-fledged institute on 1 January 1996. The main objective of VIB is to strengthen the excellence of Flemish life-sciences research and to turn the results into new economic growth.

VIB spends almost 80% of its budget on research activities, while almost 12% is spent on technology transfer activities and stimulating the creation of new businesses. VIB is member of EU-LIFE, an alliance of leading life-sciences research centres in Europe.

As of 2026, the institute is led by Christine Durinx and Jérôme Van Biervliet. Ajit Shetty is chairman of the board of directors.

== Goals ==
VIB's mission is to conduct frontline biomolecular research in life sciences for the benefit of scientific progress and the benefit of society. The strategic goals of the VIB are:

1. Strategic basic research;
2. Technology transfer policy to transfer the inventions to consumers and patients;
3. Scientific information for the general public.

== Research ==
VIB scientists work on the normal and pathological processes occurring in a cell, an organ, or an organism (humans, plants, microorganisms). Research areas include cancer biology, neuroscience, plant biology, computational biology, and inflammatory disease. VIB researchers are affiliated to one of the Flemish universities and work in research departments on different Flemish campuses: Ghent University, KU Leuven, University of Antwerp, and Vrije Universiteit Brussel.

As of 2026, VIB consists of nine centers:

- VIB Inflammation Research Center, at UGent and VUB (Scientific director: Bart Lambrecht)
- VIB.AI, VIB Center for AI & Computational Biology, at KU Leuven and UGent (Stein Aerts)
- VIB-UAntwerp Center for Molecular Neurology (Rosa Rademakers)
- VIB-UGent Center for Plant Systems Biology, UGent (Yves Van de Peer)
- VIB-UGent Medical Biotechnology Center, UGent (Nico Callewaert)
- VIB-KU Leuven Center for Cancer Biology, KU Leuven (Diether Lambrechts and Chris Marine)
- VIB-KU Leuven Center for Neuroscience (Patrik Verstreken and Joris de Wit)
- VIB-KU Leuven Center for Microbiology (Kevin Verstrepen)
- VIB-VUB Center for Structural Biology, Vrije Universiteit Brussel (Jan Steyaert)

== Service facilities ==
VIB has established several core facilities focused on advanced technologies, which make high-throughput technologies available to academic and industrial researchers in Flanders.

- VIB BioInformatics Training and Service facility
- VIB Compound Screening service Facility, UGent
- VIB Genetic Service Facility, University of Antwerp
- VIB Nucleomics Core, KU Leuven
- VIB Nanobody VHH Service Facility, Vrije Universiteit Brussel
- VIB Protein Service Facility, UGent
- VIB Proteomics Expertise Center, UGent
- VIB Bio Imaging Core, UGent and KU Leuven
- VIB Metabolomics Core, UGent and KU Leuven
- VIB Single Cell Core, UGent and KU Leuven
- VIB Tech Watch Core, UGent and KU Leuven
- VIB Spatial Catalyst, UGent

== Spin-offs ==
VIB was involved in the creation of spin-offs from academic research groups, such as for Ablynx, DevGen, CropDesign, ActoGeniX, Pronota (formerly Peakadilly), Agrosavfe, Multiplicom, Orionis, Q-biologicals, SoluCel, Aphea.Bio, Rainbow Crops and Aelin Therapeutics.

== See also ==
- Belgian Society of Biochemistry and Molecular Biology
- BIOMED (University of Hasselt)
- EMBL
- Flanders Investment and Trade
- Research Foundation – Flanders (FWO)
- GIMV
- Herman Van Den Berghe
- Institute for the promotion of Innovation by Science and Technology (IWT)
- Jozef Schell
- Lisbon Strategy
- Marc Van Montagu
- Participatiemaatschappij Vlaanderen
- Raymond Hamers
- Science and technology in Flanders
- Walter Fiers
- Wellcome Trust

== Sources ==
- J. Comijn, P. Raeymaekers, A. Van Gysel, M. Veugelers, Today = Tomorrow : a tribute to life sciences research and innovation : 10 years of VIB, Snoeck, 2006, ISBN 978-90-5349-630-5
- Biotechnology industry in Belgium
