= Eva Isaacs, Marchioness of Reading =

British philanthropist, Zionist activist and children's welfare advocate

The Most Honourable The Marchioness of Reading CBE JP
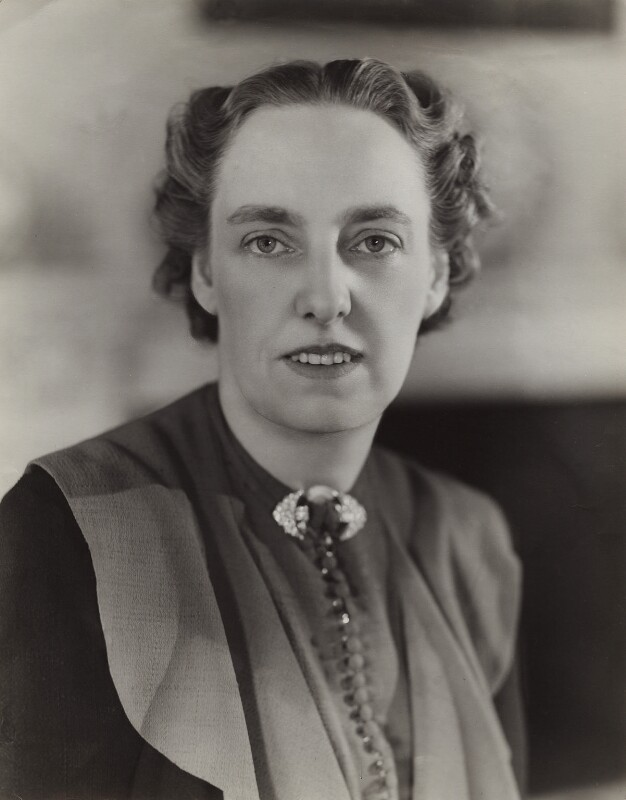
- Reading in 1938

President of the British Section of the World Jewish Congress
- In office 1939–1973

President of the National Council of Women
- In office 1955–1957
- Preceded by: Mrs Stanley Moffat
- Succeeded by: Joan Robins

Personal details
- Born: Eva Violet Mond; 6 August 1895 Chelsea, London, England
- Died: 14 August 1973 (aged 78) Thakeham, West Sussex, England
- Spouse: Gerald Isaacs, 2nd Marquess of Reading (m. 1914; died 1960)
- Children: Michael Isaacs, 3rd Marquess of Reading; Lady Joan Isaacs; Lady Elizabeth Isaacs
- Parent(s): Alfred Mond, 1st Baron Melchett; Violet Mond, Baroness Melchett
- Writing career
- Pen name: Eva Erleigh
- Genres: Children's literature; baby books

Eva Violet Isaacs, Marchioness of Reading CBE, JP (née Mond; 6 August 1895 – 14 August 1973) was a British philanthropist, Zionist activist, children's welfare advocate, and writer. Among other roles, she served as Vice President of the World Jewish Congress, President of its British section, and President of the National Council of Women.

== Biography ==
Eva Violet Mond was born in Lowndes Square, London, the eldest daughter of Sir Alfred Mond and Violet Goetze (later the 1st Baron and Baroness Melchett). Her paternal grandfather was German-born chemist and industrialist Ludwig Mond. Though her father was of Jewish descent, Eva was baptised and raised in her mother's Anglican faith.

On 28 September 1914, she married Gerald Rufus Isaacs, son of Alice Cohen and Rufus Isaacs, 1st Marquess of Reading, in a civil ceremony. She began reconnecting with her Jewish heritage after a series of trips to Palestine, and formally converted to Judaism under the supervision of Rabbi Dr. Maurice Perlzweig in 1933. She thereafter became a member of London's Liberal Jewish Synagogue and an active Zionist.

Lady Reading became involved in various child welfare charities, including as Chairman of the National Society of Day Nurseries and as member of the General Nursing Council. She toured the United States as a representative of the United Jewish Appeal in 1939, and the same year became president of the British section of the World Jewish Congress. Under her leadership, the organisation petitioned the British government to take action to save Jews during the Holocaust. She meanwhile served as regional adviser on child care for the Ministry of Health from 1940 to 1945, and served as vice chairman of the Children's Refugee Movement, which supported 10,000 orphaned Jewish refugees. She became vice president of the World Jewish Congress in 1947, and from 1955 to 1957 served as president of the National Council of Women.

She died at her home in Thakeham, West Sussex, on 14 August 1973, one week after her 78th birthday.

== Personal life ==
Lady Reading and her husband had three children:

- Michael Alfred Rufus Isaacs, 3rd Marquess of Reading (8 March 1916 – 2 July 1980), who married Margot Irene Duke;
- Lady Joan Alice Violet Isaacs JP (19 July 1918 – 25 March 2000), who married Solly Zuckerman, Baron Zuckerman; and
- Lady Elizabeth Ann Mary Hornsby (11 October 1921 – 9 February 2019).

== Titles and honours ==
She was styled as Viscountess Erleigh from 1917, and as Marchioness of Reading upon her father-in-law's death in 1935. She was appointed Commander of the Order of the British Empire in 1957 for her work in child welfare, and in 1971 received an honorary fellowship from the Hebrew University of Jerusalem in recognition of her "distinguished services to the cause of Israel and humanity".

== Publications ==
- Erleigh, Eva (1926). In the Beginning: A First History for Little Children. New York: Doubleday, Page & Company. Illustrated by Mary Adshead.
- Erleigh, Eva (1927). The Little One's Log: Baby's Record. London: The Library Press Limited. Illustrated by E. H. Shepard.
- Viscountess Erleigh, ed. (1928). The Mind of the Growing Child. New York: Oxford University Press.
- The Marchioness of Reading (1940). The Toddlers' Diet Book for Mothers and Children. London: The National Society of Day Nurseries.
- Reading, Eva Isaacs, Marchioness of (1973). For the Record: The Memoirs of Eva, Marchioness of Reading. London: Hutchinson & Co. ISBN 978-0-09-115760-9.
