= Simon Isaacs, 4th Marquess of Reading =

English banker and aristocrat (1942–2026)

The Most Honourable The Marquess of Reading

Member of the House of Lords Lord Temporal
- In office 2 July 1980 – 11 November 1999; Hereditary peerage
- Preceded by: The 3rd Marquess of Reading
- Succeeded by: seat abolished

Personal details
- Born: 18 May 1942
- Died: 26 October 2026 (aged 84)
- Spouse: Victoria Melinda Dewar
- Children: 3, including Lady Natasha Rufus Isaacs
- Parent(s): Michael Isaacs, 3rd Marquess of Reading; Margot Duke

Simon Charles Henry Rufus Isaacs, 4th Marquess of Reading (18 May 1942 – 26 October 2026) was a British peer, banker and philanthropist.

== Biography ==
=== Early life ===
Simon Charles Henry Rufus Isaacs was born on 18 May 1942. His father was Michael Isaacs, 3rd Marquess of Reading, and his mother was Margot Irene (née Duke). His paternal grandfather was Gerald Isaacs, 2nd Marquess of Reading. His paternal great-grandfather was Rufus Isaacs, 1st Marquess of Reading. He became the fourth Marquess of Reading after his father's death in 1980. His maternal great-grandparents were Alfred Moritz Mond, 1st Baron Melchett, and Violet Mond, Baroness Melchett. Violet Mond's grandfather was Ludwig Mond, chemist and industrialist, who created the Mond process to extract and purify nickel.

=== Career ===
Reading was a lieutenant in 1st The Queen's Dragoon Guards from 1961 to 1964.

He worked as a stockbroker from 1964 to 1974, and he was a member of the London Stock Exchange from 1970 to 1974. From 1975 to 1980, he was marketing director of Brahmco International. He worked for Ralph Lauren Cosmetics from 1979 to 1983. He then worked for Abbey Lubbock and Abbey Sports and Events from 1984 to 1992.

Reading was a business partner of Prince Michael of Kent.

=== Philanthropy ===
Reading was Chairman of the Land's End John o' Groats Club from 1992 to 1996. He served as director of the Global Flying Hospitals from 1996 to 2000. From 1990 to 2000, he was president of the Dean Close School in Cheltenham, Gloucestershire. He has served on the Board of Directors of CURE International since 2004, and of the Mertens House in Saint Petersburg, Russia since 2008. He served as a member of the Council of the Garden Tomb in Jerusalem from 2002 to 2008.

He was a patron of the Nelson Recovery Trust and, since 1998, of the Barnabas Fund.

In 2003, he criticized the decision made by the vice-chancellor of the University of Sussex, Alasdair Smith, to sell Swanborough Manor in Iford, East Sussex, which was donated by his step-great-grandmother, Stella Isaacs, Marchioness of Reading (1894–1971), in the hope that it would serve as the main residence of the vice-chancellor until 2021.

In May 2022 Lord Reading was one of the Patrons of The Royal Versailles Ball, a charitable event which took place at the Palace of Versailles. Earlier that year, he was awarded the Order of Menelik II (Grand Cross) by the Crown Council of Ethiopia for his charitable work.

=== Personal life and death ===
Reading married Melinda Dewar on 12 May 1979. They have three children:

- Lady Sybilla Alice Rufus Isaacs (3 November 1980) she married Charles B. B. Hart on 9 July 2005. They have four children.
- Lady Natasha Rufus Isaacs (24 April 1983) she married Rupert Finch on 8 June 2013. They have three daughters.
- Julian Michael Rufus Isaacs, 5th Marquess of Reading (26 May 1986).

In May 2021 he announced his intention to seek Israeli citizenship. He was a supporter of Israel and saw this as one of his main causes: "Both Lady Reading and myself are focused on bringing International Diplomats and people of influence to Israel and showing them how important it is to support Israel at the UN and to counter Antisemitism".

Reading was a committed Christian, supporting organisations like The Bible Society, and other Christian organisations, in his life.

Reading died on 26 October 2026, aged 84.

== Arms ==
Coat of arms of Simon Isaacs, 4th Marquess of Reading
Coronet Coronet of a marquess. Crest In front of a leopard's head couped sable, a fasces as in the arms. Escutcheon Sable, a bend between two leopards' faces or, on a chief argent a fasces fessewise proper. Supporters On either side a leopard proper, round the neck a collar or, pendant therefrom an escutcheon argent charged with a human head affrontée proper erased at the neck, ducally crowned proper. Motto Aut nunquam tentes, aut perspice (Either do not attempt, or complete).

Peerage of the United Kingdom
Preceded by Simon Isaacs	Marquess of Reading; 1980–2026	Succeeded by Julian Isaacs
