= Michael Isaacs, 3rd Marquess of Reading =

British aristocrat and banker (1916–1980)

The Most Honourable The Marquess of Reading

Member of the House of Lords Lord Temporal
- In office 19 September 1960 – 2 July 1980; Hereditary Peerage
- Preceded by: The 2nd Marquess of Reading
- Succeeded by: The 4th Marquess of Reading

Personal details
- Born: 8 March 1916 Chelsea, London, England
- Died: 2 July 1980 (aged 64) Shipton-under-Wychwood, Oxfordshire, England
- Spouse: Margot Duke (m. 1940)
- Children: Simon Rufus Isaacs, 4th Marquess of Reading, Lord Alexander Rufus Isaacs; Lady Jacqueline Rufus Isaacs
- Parent(s): Gerald Isaacs, 2nd Marquess of Reading; Hon. Eva Violet Mond

Michael Alfred Rufus Isaacs, 3rd Marquess of Reading (8 March 1916 – 2 July 1980) was an English aristocrat and banker.

== Biography ==
=== Early life ===
He was born in 1916. His father was Gerald Rufus Isaacs, 2nd Marquess of Reading (1889–1960), and his paternal grandfather was Rufus Isaacs, 1st Marquess of Reading (1860–1935). His mother was Eva Violet Mond (1895–1973), daughter of Alfred Mond, 1st Baron Melchett (1868–1930) and Violet Mond, Baroness Melchett (1867–1945). Eva Violet Mond's grandfather Ludwig Mond (1839–1909), chemist and industrialist, created the Mond process to extract and purify nickel.

He became the 3rd Marquess of Reading after his father's death in 1960.

=== Career ===
He was a member of the London Stock Exchange.

=== Personal life ===
He was married to Margot Irene (née Duke). They had three sons, Simon Rufus Isaacs, 4th Marquess of Reading (1942–2026), Lord Antony Rufus Isaacs (born 1943) and Lord Alexander Rufus Isaacs (born 1957), and a daughter, Lady Jacqueline Rosemary Margaret Rufus Isaacs (born 1946), who married Sir Mark Wilfrid Home Thomson, 3rd Baronet (born 1939).

He died in 1980, and Lady Reading lived until 2015.

== Arms ==
Coat of arms of Michael Isaacs, 3rd Marquess of Reading
Coronet Coronet of a marquess. Crest In front of a leopard's head couped sable, a fasces as in the arms. Escutcheon Sable, a bend between two leopards' faces or, on a chief argent a fasces fessewise proper. Supporters On either side a leopard proper, round the neck a collar or, pendant therefrom an escutcheon argent charged with a human head affrontée proper erased at the neck, ducally crowned proper. Motto Aut nunquam tentes, aut perspice (Either do not attempt, or complete).

Peerage of the United Kingdom
Preceded by Gerald Isaacs	Marquess of Reading; 1960–1980	Succeeded by Simon Isaacs
