= Lady Natasha Finch =

British socialite and fashion designer

- Born: Natasha Rose Eleanor Isaacs; 24 April 1983 (age 43); Swindon, Wiltshire, England
- Education: Westonbirt School
- Occupation: Designer
- Years active: 2010–current
- Label: Beulah London
- Spouse: Rupert Finch (m. 2013)
- Children: 3
- Parent(s): Simon Isaacs, 4th Marquess of Reading; Melinda Victoria Dewar
- Relatives: Rufus Isaacs, Alfred Moritz Mond, Violet Mond (great-great grandparents)

Lady Natasha Rose Eleanor Finch (née Isaacs; born 24 April 1983) is an English aristocrat, fashion designer and founder of Beulah London.

== Early life ==
Isaacs is the second child of Simon Isaacs, 4th Marquess of Reading, and Melinda Victoria Isaacs (née Dewar). Isaacs' father was a close friend of King Charles, and while growing up she became close to the younger members of the British royal family. Isaacs later became a close friend of Catherine Middleton, as well as Princess Beatrice, Jack Brooksbank and Lady Kitty Spencer.

== Career ==
In 2010, Isaacs founded Beulah London with Lavinia Brennan. Brennan and Isaacs were inspired to start the brand after learning about human trafficking on a trip to India. Beulah London creates eco-friendly clothing in collaboration with NGO partners working with women craftspeople. The luxury label commemorates anti trafficking and anti slavery initiatives in its designs.

The brand gained significant recognition in the United Kingdom after launch when its designs were publicly worn by Finch's friend Catherine Middleton and other members of the royal family.

In 2015, buoyed by their brand visibility, the brand underwent expansion.

In 2020, the brand collapsed, leaving creditors bereft. The company later relaunched the same year.

== Marriage and children ==
On 8 June 2013, Isaacs married lawyer Rupert Finch in Cirencester.

The couple has three daughters:

- Georgia Finch (b. 2015);
- Cienna Finch (b. 2017);
- India Finch (b. 2020).
