= GFH =

GFH may refer to:

- Ghetto Fighters' House, a museum in Israel
- Glens Falls Hospital, in New York, United States
- Global Flying Hospitals, a humanitarian medical charity
- GFH Financial Group, a Bahraini investment bank
