= Lowndes Square =

Square in central London

Coordinates: 51°30′01″N 0°09′31″W

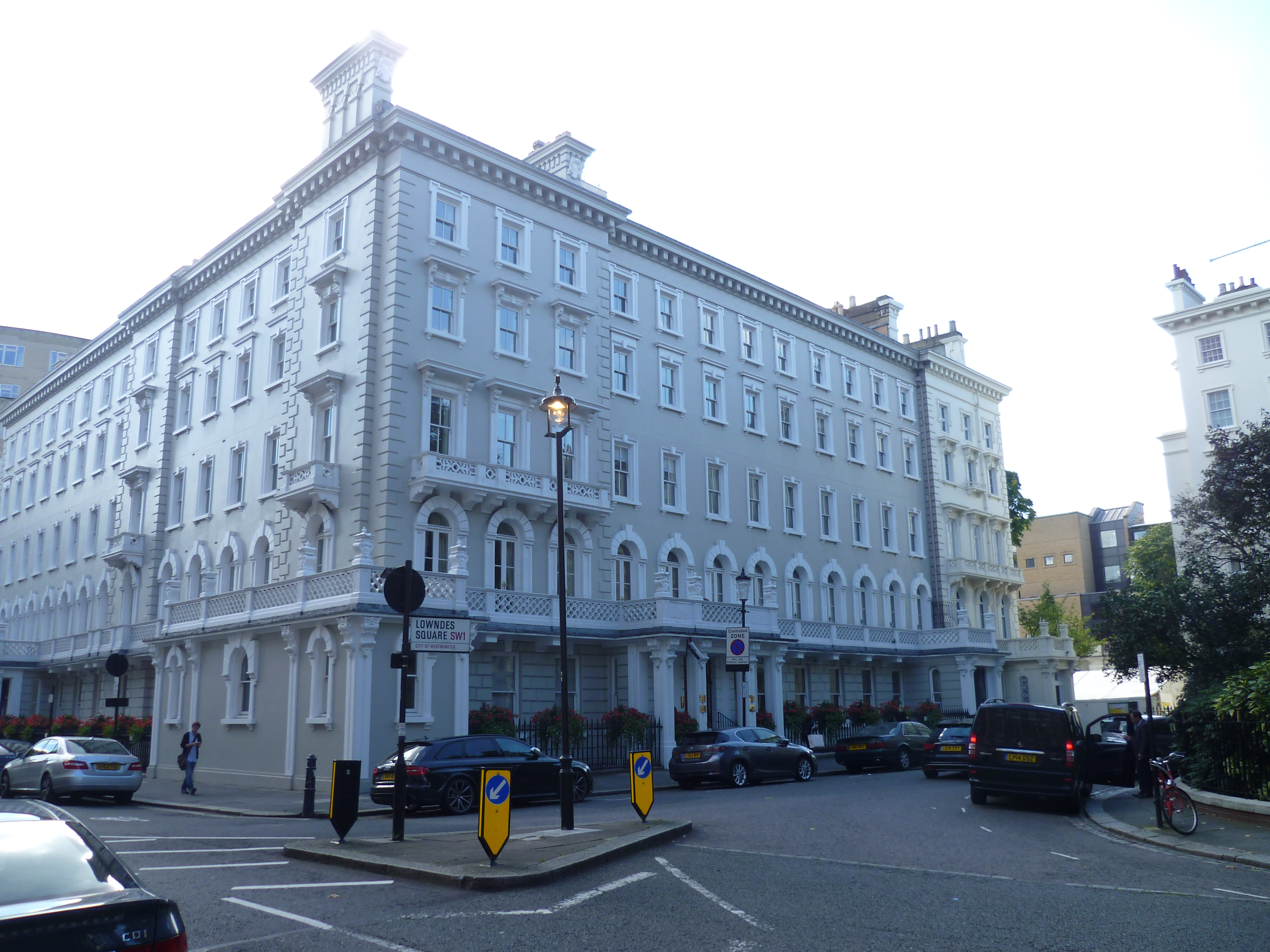
Lowndes Square

Lowndes Square is a residential garden square at the north-west end of Belgravia, London, SW1. It is formed of archetypal grand terraces of light stucco houses, cream or white. The length of the central rectangular garden is parallel with Sloane Street to the west; visible from the north-west corner is a corner of the Harvey Nichols store, beyond which is Knightsbridge tube station. Ecclesiastically (that is, in the Anglican Church), it remains in a northern projection of one of the parishes of Chelsea, except its east side, which is in the very small parish of St Paul, Knightsbridge, a division which is mirrored secularly by the boundaries of two London Boroughs (Westminster and Kensington and Chelsea).

== Ownership and building design ==
The square has the highest percentage of highly anonymous (shell company) ownership in the UK, accounting for 40% of the houses.

Its houses are valued in excess of £10 million and so are mainly internally converted into apartments, some of which are multi-level. Locally listed building status for most of the buildings means the façades and exterior structure above ground must remain little changed. Nos. 11 and 12 have higher, main statutory-level protection.

As with Belgrave Square, George Basevi designed most of the houses. Lowndes Court, a classical apartment block, takes up the south side bar No. 34 (former Nos. 28–33); the north side (former No. 50 and possibly higher) is the Park Tower (Hotel), which fronts Knightsbridge, an arterial road on the other side.

The Pakistan High Commission takes up an interior conversion of Nos. 35–36.

== Context and central garden ==
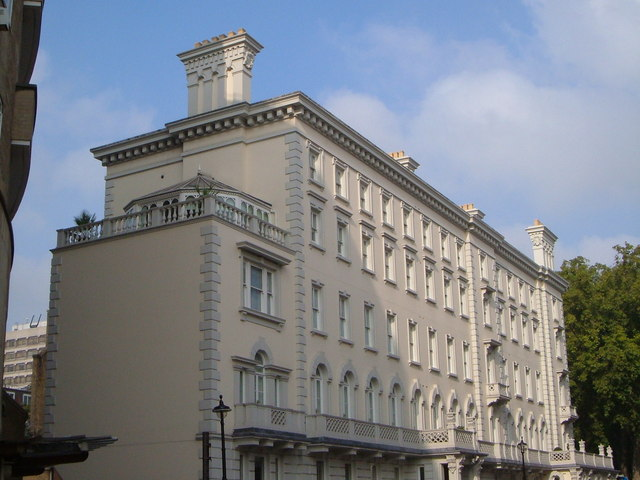
Lowndes Street where it enters Lowndes Square (trees to the right)

On the other side of Sloane Street are Wilton Crescent and Belgrave Square, notable garden squares of London which are also designed by Basevi.

The private communal garden is 0.4009 hectares (0.991 acres) and contains plane trees and shrubs.

== In film, fiction and the media ==
This was a setting in the Edward Frederic Benson novel The Countess of Lowndes Square.

In Alan Hollinghurst's novel The Line of Beauty, the Ouradi family live on the square.

Nicolas Roeg and Donald Cammell's 1970 film Performance, starring Mick Jagger and James Fox, used interiors of Leonard Plugge's Lowndes Square house.

== Notable residents ==
- Jomo Kenyatta (1892–1978), first president of Kenya
- William Lowndes (1652–1724), politician
- Lord Alan Spencer-Churchill (1825–1873), businessman and great-uncle of Winston Churchill
- Lord Haliburton (1832–1907), civil servant, at No. 57.
- Claude Bowes-Lyon, 14th Earl of Strathmore and Kinghorne (1855–1944), landowner and maternal grandfather of Elizabeth II
- Geoffrey Lubbock (1873–1932), High Sheriff of the County of London
- H.D. (1886–1961), American poet
- Leonard Plugge (1889–1981), radio entrepreneur and Conservative MP for Chatham (1935–1945)
- Margaret Lowenfeld (1890–1973), child psychologist
- Oswald Mosley (1896–1980), fascist party leader
- Lady Diana Mosley (1910-2003), aristocrat, writer, married to Sir Oswald Mosley
- Eric Lubbock, 4th Baron Avebury (1928–2016), Liberal politician
- Garland Anderson (1933–2001), American composer
- Roman Abramovich (born 1966), Russian tycoon
- Alfred Mond, 1st Baron Melchett, Parliamentarian (first Liberal and then Conservative), and Violet Mond, Baroness Melchett, humanitarian, activist, and social hostess
