= J. D. Bernal =

Irish scientist, pioneer of X-ray crystallography in biology (1901–1971)

John Desmond Bernal FRS
- Bernal in 1949, photo by Wolfgang Suschitzky
- Born: 10 May 1901; Nenagh, County Tipperary, Ireland
- Died: 15 September 1971 (aged 70); London, England
- Resting place: Battersea Cemetery, Morden (unmarked)
- Education: Bedford School, University of Cambridge
- Known for: Bernal chart Bernal sphere Bernal stacking Bernal–Fowler rules Zone melting
- Spouse: Agnes Eileen Sprague (m. 1922)
- Children: 4, including Martin
- Awards: Royal Medal (1945); Guthrie lecture (1947); Stalin Peace Prize (1953); Grotius Gold Medal (1959); Bakerian Lecture (1962)
- Scientific career
- Fields: X-ray crystallography
- Workplaces: Birkbeck College, University of London
- Doctoral advisor: William Henry Bragg
- Doctoral students: Dorothy Hodgkin; Alan Mackay; Max Perutz; Alexander F. Wells
- Military career
- Allegiance: United Kingdom
- Branch: Royal Navy
- Service years: 1944–1945
- Rank: Lieutenant (RNVR)
- Conflicts: Second World War: Operation Overlord; Normandy landings

John Desmond Bernal FRS (/bərˈnɑːl/; 10 May 1901 – 15 September 1971) was an Irish scientist who pioneered the use of X-ray crystallography in molecular biology. He published extensively on the history of science. In addition, Bernal wrote popular books on science and society. He was a communist activist and a member of the Communist Party of Great Britain (CPGB).

== Education and early life ==
His family was Irish, with a mix of Spanish, Portuguese, Italian and Sephardic Jewish on his father's side (his grandfather Jacob Genese, properly Ginesi, had adopted the family name Bernal of his paternal grandmother around 1837). His father Samuel Bernal had been raised as a Catholic in Limerick and after graduating from Albert Agricultural College spent 14 years in Australia before returning to County Tipperary to buy a farm, Brookwatson, near Nenagh where Bernal was brought up. His American mother, née Elizabeth Miller, whose mother was from Antrim, was a graduate of Stanford University and a journalist and had converted to Catholicism. Elizabeth was raised Protestant and would send John to a Protestant school in his youth.

Bernal was educated in England first for one term at Stonyhurst College, which he hated and so was moved to Bedford School at the age of 13. A pupil at the school from 1914 to 1919, according to Goldsmith he found it "extremely unpleasant" and most of his fellow students "bored him", but his younger brother Kevin, who was also there, was "some consolation", while Brown claims that "he seemed to adjust easily to life" there. In 1919, he went to Emmanuel College, Cambridge, with a scholarship.

At Cambridge, Bernal read both mathematics and science for a Bachelor of Arts degree in 1922, which he followed by another year of natural sciences. He taught himself the theory of space groups, including the quaternion method, which became the mathematical basis of a lengthy paper on crystal structure for which he won a joint prize with Ronald G.W. Norrish in his third year. At Cambridge, he also became known as "Sage", a nickname given to him about 1920 by a young woman working in Charles Kay Ogden's Bookshop at the corner of Bridge Street.

== Career and research ==
After his graduation, Bernal began research under William Henry Bragg at the Davy Faraday Laboratory at the Royal Institution in London. In 1924 he determined the structure of graphite (the Bernal stacking describes the registry of two graphite planes) and also did work on the crystal structure of bronze. His strength was in analysis as much as experimental method, and his mathematical and practical treatment of determining crystal structure was widely studied, but he also developed an X-ray spectro-goniometer.

In 1927, he was appointed as the first lecturer in Structural Crystallography at Cambridge, becoming the assistant director of the Cavendish Laboratory in 1934. There, he started applying his crystallographic techniques to organic molecules, starting with oestrin and sterol compounds including cholesterol in 1929, forcing a radical change of thinking among sterol chemists. While at Cambridge, he analysed vitamin B_{1} (1933), pepsin (1934), vitamin D_{2} (1935), the sterols (1936) and the tobacco mosaic virus (1937).

He also worked on the structure of liquid water, showing the boomerang shape of its molecule (1933). It was in Bernal's research group that after a year working with Tiny Powell at Oxford, Dorothy Hodgkin continued her early research career. Together, in 1934, they took the first X-ray photographs of hydrated protein crystals using the trick of bathing the crystals in their mother liquor, giving one of the first glimpses of the world of molecular structure that underlies living things. Max Perutz arrived as a student from Vienna in 1936 and started the work on haemoglobin that would occupy him most of his career.

However, Bernal was refused fellowships at Emmanuel and Christ's and tenure by Ernest Rutherford, who disliked him, and in 1937, Bernal became Professor of Physics at Birkbeck College, University of London, a department that had been brought to the first rank by Patrick Blackett. The same year, he was elected as a Fellow of the Royal Society. After World War II, he established Birkbeck's Biomolecular Research Laboratory in two Georgian houses in Torrington Square with 15 researchers. It was there that Aaron Klug and Rosalind Franklin worked on tobacco mosaic virus, and Andrew Donald Booth developed some of the earliest computers to help with the computation.

His Guthrie lecture of 1947 concentrated on proteins as the basis of life, but it was Max Perutz, still at Cambridge, who developed the X-ray structural analysis of globular proteins in Britain. In the early 1960s, Bernal returned to the subject of the origin of life, analysing meteorites for evidence of complex molecules, and to the topic of the structure of liquids, which he talked about in his Bakerian lecture in 1962.

=== Ministry of Home Security ===
In the early 1930s, Bernal had been arguing for peace, but that changed after the Spanish Civil War started. With the outbreak of World War II in 1939, Bernal joined the Ministry of Home Security, where he brought in Solly Zuckerman to carry out the first proper analyses of the effects of enemy bombing and of explosions on animals and people. Their subsequent analysis of the effects of bombs on Birmingham and Kingston upon Hull showed that city bombing produced little disruption and production was affected only by direct hits on factories. A supper for scientists organised by the Tots and Quots in Soho generated a multi-author book Science in War produced in a month by Allen Lane, one of the guests, arguing that science should be applied in every part of the war effort.

From 1942, he and Zuckerman served as scientific advisers to Lord Louis Mountbatten, the Chief of Combined Operations. Bernal was able to argue on both sides of Project Habbakuk, Geoffrey Pyke's proposal to build huge aircraft landing platforms in the North Atlantic made of ice. He rescued Max Perutz from internment, getting him to perform experiments on ice related to Habbakuk in a meat store freezer below Smithfield Meat Market. This project indirectly marked his divergence from Zuckerman, when he was recalled from a joint tour of the Middle East investigating the co-operation of army and air force, but the tour established Zuckerman's reputation as a military scientist.

=== Operation Overlord and D-Day ===
After the disaster of the Dieppe raid, Bernal was determined that its mistakes not be repeated in Operation Overlord. He demonstrated the advantages of an artificial harbour to the participants of the Quebec Conference in 1943, as the only British scientist present. On 3 June 1944, he was commissioned a temporary lieutenant (Special Branch) in the Royal Naval Volunteer Reserve (RNVR). His main contribution to the Normandy landings was the detailed mapping of the beaches, which had to be done without attracting any German attention. His knowledge of the area stemmed from research in English libraries, personal experience (he had visited Arromanches on previous holidays) and aerial surveys.

At Bernal's memorial service, Zuckerman downplayed Bernal's part in the Normandy landings and said that he was not cleared for the highest levels of security. Given Bernal's Marxist and pro-Soviet sympathies, it is perhaps remarkable that there has never been any suggestion that he fed any information in that direction. However, Brown provides evidence of Bernal's contributions to the preparation and the success of the invasion.

After assisting in the preparations for D-Day with work on the structure of the proposed landing sites and the bocage countryside beyond, Bernal landed, according to C. P. Snow, at Normandy on the afternoon of D-Day+1 in the uniform of an Instructor-Lieutenant Royal Navy to record the effectiveness of the plans. He also assisted boats floundering on the rocks by using his knowledge of the area but said, "I committed the frightful solecism of not knowing which was port and which side was starboard".

=== Application of Marxism to science ===
Raised as a Catholic, Bernal became a socialist in Cambridge as a result of a long night arguing with a friend. He also became an atheist. According to one reviewer, "This conversion, as complete as St. Paul's on the road to Damascus, goes some way to account for, but not excuse, Bernal's blind allegiance for the rest of his life, to the Soviet Union". He joined the Communist Party of Great Britain (CPGB) in 1923. His membership evidently lapsed when he returned to Cambridge in 1927 and was not renewed until 1933, and he may have lost his card again shortly afterward.

Bernal became a prominent intellectual in political life, particularly in the 1930s. He attended the famous 1931 meeting on the history of science, where he met the Soviets Nikolai Bukharin, and Boris Hessen who gave an influential Marxist account of the work of Isaac Newton. That meeting fundamentally changed his world view and he maintained sympathy for the Soviet Union and Joseph Stalin. In 1939, Bernal published The Social Function of Science, probably the earliest text on the sociology of science.

After World War II, although Bernal had been involved in evaluating the effects of atomic attacks against the Soviet Union, he supported the World Congress of Intellectuals for Peace organised in Communist Poland in 1948. Afterwards, he wrote a letter to the New Statesman warning that the United States was preparing "a war for complete world domination". Consequently, when Bernal was invited to a world peace conference in New York in February 1949, his visa was refused. However, he was allowed into the French Fourth Republic in April for the World Congress of the Partisans of Peace, with Frédéric Joliot-Curie as president and Bernal as vice-president. The following year the organisation changed its name to the World Peace Council.

On 20 September 1949, after his return from giving a speech strongly critical of the Western Bloc at a peace conference in Moscow, the Evening Star newspaper of Ipswich published an interview with Bernal in which he endorsed Soviet agriculture and the "proletarian science" of Trofim Lysenko. The Lysenko affair had erupted in August 1948, when Stalin authorised Lysenko's theory of plant genetics as official Soviet orthodoxy, and he refused any deviation. Bernal and the whole British scientific left were damaged by his support for Lysenko's theory, even after many scientists had abandoned their sympathy for the Soviet Union.

Under pressure from the burgeoning Cold War, the president of British Royal Society had resigned from the Soviet Academy of Sciences in November 1948. In November 1949, the British Association for the Advancement of Science removed Bernal from membership of its council. Membership in British radical science groups quickly declined. Unlike some of his socialist colleagues, Bernal persisted in defending the Soviet position on Lysenko. He publicly refused to accept the gaping fissures that the dispute revealed between the study of natural science and dialectical materialism.

In November 1950, Pablo Picasso, a fellow communist, en route to a Soviet-sponsored World Peace Congress in Sheffield, created a mural in Bernal's flat at the top of No. 22 Torrington Square. In 2007, it became part of the Wellcome Trust's collection for £250,000.

Throughout the 1950s, Bernal maintained a faith in the Soviet Union as a vehicle for the creation of a socialist scientific utopia. In 1953, he was awarded the Stalin Peace Prize. From 1959 to 1965, he was president of the World Peace Council.

=== Awards and honours ===
Bernal was awarded the Royal Medal in 1945, the Guthrie lecture in 1947, the Stalin Peace Prize in 1953, the Grotius Gold Medal in 1959 and the Bakerian Lecture in 1962.

Bernal was elected a Fellow of the Royal Society in 1937. A fictional portrait of Bernal appears in the novel The Search, an early work of his friend C. P. Snow. He was also said to be the inspiration for the character Tengal in The Holiday by Stevie Smith. The Bernal Lecture and its successor the Wilkins-Bernal-Medawar Lecture Medal and Lecture were named in his honour.

=== Legacy ===
The Bernal Institute at the University of Limerick was named in his honour. He is the eponym of the John Desmond Bernal Prize.

Bernal's brass microscope, in the possession of his great-grandson, was restored in an episode of the BBC Television series The Repair Shop shown in April 2023.

Bernal's name stays attached to the Bernal Sphere, a space station concept he proposed in 1929, which was later refined as Island One by Dr. Gerard K. O'Neill at Stanford University in 1975 and 1976.

== Personal life ==
Bernal had two children – Mike (1926–2016) and Egan (b. 1930) – with his wife Agnes Eileen Sprague (1898–1990), a secretary, who was usually referred to as Eileen. He married Sprague on 21 June 1922, the day after having been awarded his BA degree. Bernal was 21, Sprague 23. Sprague was described as an active socialist and their marriage as 'open' which they both lived up to 'with great gusto'.

In the early 1930s he had a brief intimate relationship with chemist Dorothy Hodgkin, whose scientific research work he mentored. He had a long-term relationship with the artists' patron Margaret Gardiner. Their son Martin Bernal (1937–2013) was a professor in the Department of Government at Cornell University and author of the controversial Black Athena. Margaret referred to herself as "Mrs. Bernal", though the two never married. Eileen is mentioned as his widow in 1990.

He also had a child (Jane, born 1953) with Margot Heinemann.

== Publications ==
Bernal's 1929 work The World, the Flesh and the Devil has been called "the most brilliant attempt at scientific prediction ever made" by Arthur C. Clarke. It is famous for having been the first to propose the so-called Bernal sphere, a type of space habitat intended for permanent residence. The second chapter explores radical changes to human bodies and intelligence and the third discusses the impact of these on society.

In The Social Function of Science (1939) he argued that science was not an individual pursuit of abstract knowledge and that the support of research and development should be dramatically increased. Eugene Garfield, originator of the Science Citation Index, said "his idea of a centralized reprint center was in my thoughts when I first proposed the as yet nonexistent SCI in Science in 1955."

Science in History (1954) is a monumental four-volume attempt to analyse the interaction between science and society. The Origin of Life (1967) gives the current ideas from Oparin and Haldane onwards.

Other publications include

- Bernal, J. D. (1926). "On the Interpretation of X-Ray, Single Crystal, Rotation Photographs". Proceedings of the Royal Society of London. 113 (763): 117–160. Bibcode:1926RSPSA.113..117B. doi:10.1098/rspa.1926.0143. hdl:2027/mdp.39015038679158.
- The World, the Flesh & the Devil: An Enquiry into the Future of the Three Enemies of the Rational Soul (1929) Jonathan Cape. Scholar Robert Scholes calls this a "book of breathtaking scientific speculation" that "is probably the single most influential source of science fiction ideas."
- Aspects of Dialectical Materialism (1934) with E. F. Carritt, Ralph Fox, Hyman Levy, John Macmurray, R. Page Arnot
- The Social Function of Science (1939) Faber & Faber
- Science and the Humanities (1946) pamphlet
- The Freedom of Necessity (1949)
- The Physical Basis of Life (1951)
- Marx and Science (1952) Marxism Today Series No. 9
- Science and Industry in the Nineteenth Century (1953) Routledge.
- Bernal, J. D. (1953). "Stalin as Scientist". Modern Quarterly. 8 (3).
- Science in History (1954) four volumes in later editions, The Emergence of Science; The Scientific and Industrial Revolutions; The Natural Sciences in Our Time; The Social Sciences: Conclusions. Faber & Faber
- World without War (1958)
- A Prospect of Peace (1960)
- Need There Be Need? (1960) pamphlet
- The Origin of Life (1967)
- Emergence of Science (1971)
- The Extension of Man. A History of Physics before 1900 (1972) M.I.T. Press also as A History of Classical Physics from Antiquity to the Quantum
- Engels and Science, Labour Monthly pamphlet
- After Twenty-five Years
- Peace to the World, British Peace Committee pamphlet
- Bernal, J. D. (1968). "The relation of microscopic structure to molecular structure". Quarterly Reviews of Biophysics. 1 (1): 81–87. doi:10.1017/S0033583500000469. PMID 4885734. S2CID 32833369.
- Bernal, J. D. (1965). "The structure of water and its biological implications". Symposia of the Society for Experimental Biology. 19: 17–32. PMID 5849048.
- Bernal, J. D. (1953). "The Use of Fourier Transforms in Protein Crystal Analysis". Proceedings of the Royal Society B: Biological Sciences. 141 (902): 71–85. Bibcode:1953RSPSB.141...71B. doi:10.1098/rspb.1953.0022. PMID 13047272. S2CID 8614975.
- Bernal, J. D. (1952). "Phase Determination in the X-Ray Diffraction Patterns of Complex Crystals and its Application to Protein Structure". Nature. 169 (4311): 1007–1008. Bibcode:1952Natur.169.1007B. doi:10.1038/1691007a0. PMID 14947858. S2CID 2503892.
