= Max Saunders =

British writer

Max Saunders (born 24 June 1957) is a British academic and writer specialising in modern literature. He is the author of Imagined Futures: Writing, Science, and Modernity in the To-Day and To-Morrow Book Series, 1923-31, Ford Madox Ford: A Dual Life, and Self Impression: Life-Writing, Autobiografiction, and the Forms of Modern Literature. He is the editor of the Oxford World’s Classics edition of Ford’s The Good Soldier, and of four volumes of Ford Madox Ford’s writing including Some Do Not …, the first book for Ford’s First World War tetralogy Parade’s End for Carcanet Press.

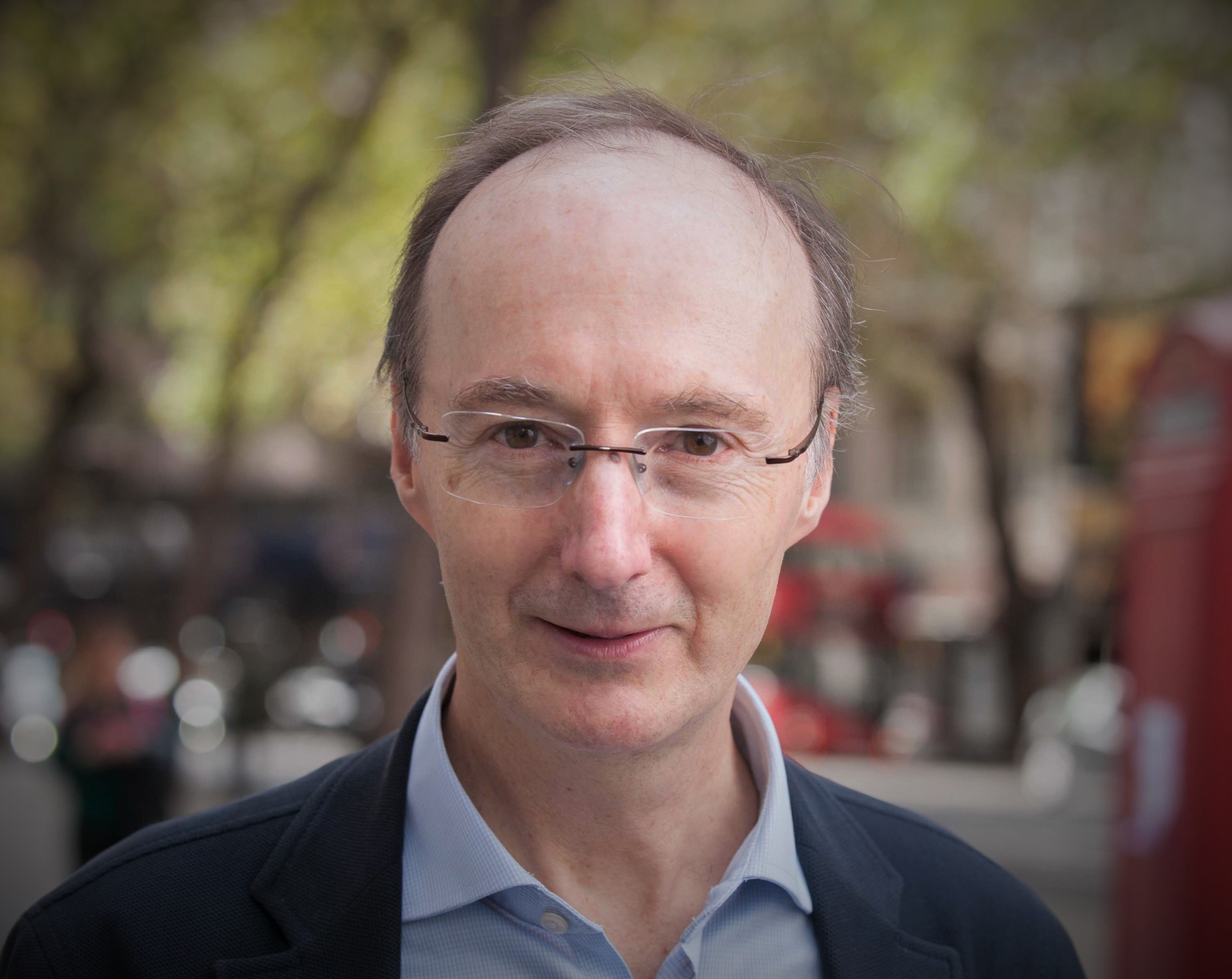
Professor Max Saunders

From 2014 to 2019 Saunders led the Ego-Media Project: a collaborative interdisciplinary project on life writing and the digital age, based in the King's College London Centre for Life-Writing Research, and funded by an Advanced Grant from the European Research Council.

== Biography ==
Saunders was educated at Sevenoaks School in Kent, and won an entrance scholarship to Queens' College, Cambridge. After receiving a master's degree from Harvard University, he returned to Cambridge, where he took his PhD under the supervision of Frank Kermode and Tony Tanner. He was a research fellow and then college lecturer at Selwyn College, Cambridge, before moving to King's College London in 1989, teaching modern English, European, and American literature. He became professor of English in 2000, co-director of the Centre for Life-Writing Research in 2007, and director of the Arts and Humanities Research Institute at King's College, London from 2012 to 2018. In 2007, he was awarded a Leverhulme Major Research Fellowship for his work on the To-Day and To-Morrow book series.

Saunders became interdisciplinary professor of modern literature and culture at the University of Birmingham in September 2019.

He is the stepson of the painter Alfred Cohen (1920-2001), and co-edited (with Sarah MacDougall) the book: Alfred Cohen -- An American Artist in Europe: Between Figuration and Abstraction (London: Ben Uri Exhibitions /Wighton: The Alfred Cohen Art Foundation, 2020)
