= Science in History =

Book by John Desmond Bernal

Science in History is a four-volume book by scientist and historian John Desmond Bernal, published in 1954. It was the first comprehensive attempt to analyse the reciprocal relations of science and society throughout history. It was originally published in London by Watts. There were three editions up to 1969. It was republished by MIT Press in 1971 and is still in print.

It is one of the sources for the idea - considered erroneous by modern historians - that Medieval Christianity had returned to the pre-scientific notion of a Flat Earth:

"In medieval times there was a return to the concept of a flat Earth and a dogmatism about the crystalline celestial spheres, here epitomized in a woodcut showing the machinery responsible for their motion discovered by an inquirer who has broken through the outer sphere of fixed stars. Sixteenth century." - Science in History, vol. 1, The Emergence of Science.

== The Volumes ==
- Vol.1, The Emergence of Science, ISBN 0-262-52020-6
- Vol.2, The Scientific and Industrial Revolution, ISBN 0-262-52021-4
- Vol.3, The Natural Sciences in Our Time, ISBN 0-262-52082-6
- Vol.4, The Social Sciences: Conclusion, ISBN 0-262-52023-0
