= Lady Joan Zuckerman =

British hostess, writer and painter

The Right Honourable The Lady Zuckerman
- Born: Joan Alice Violet Isaacs; 19 July 1918; Sussex, England
- Died: 25 March 2000 (aged 81); Burnham Thorpe, Norfolk, England
- Spouse: Solly Zuckerman, Baron Zuckerman (m. 1939; died 1993)
- Children: 2
- Parent(s): Gerald Isaacs, 2nd Marquess of Reading; Eva Violet Mond

Joan Alice Violet Zuckerman, Baroness Zuckerman (born Lady Joan Alice Violet Isaacs; 19 July 1918 – 25 March 2000) was a British hostess, writer and painter.

== Life ==
Zuckerman was born in Sussex in 1918. Her mother was the Honourable Eva Violet Mond, President of the National Council of Women. Her father was the politician Gerald Isaacs, 2nd Marquess of Reading.

In 1939, Zuckerman married the scientist Solly Zuckerman, Baron Zuckerman, OM, KCB, FRS (1904–1993). They were both friends with prominent members of the Labour Party including Hugh and Dora Gaitskell and Roy and Jennifer Jenkins. She was said to have a happy marriage. They had two children Paul and Stella. Stella died in 1992.

In 1950 she and her husband were involved with organising a meeting of the British Association for the Advancement of Science in Birmingham. Scientist Henry Tizard and Nobel laureate Patrick Blackett were among their house guests and formal attire was required.

The artist Alfred Cohen's wife Diana opened a gallery which made them friends, notably Zuckerman. Diana gave Zuckerman an exhibition and the gallery were then surprised to receive a day's notice of a visit by the Queen Mother and her entourage.

In 1979 the book The Birmingham Heritage was published. She had co-written this with Geoffrey Eley. The book carried a foreword written by the politician, Roy Jenkins. She had an artist friend of hers to sketch Roy's portrait.

== Death and legacy ==
Zuckerman died in Burnham Thorpe in 2000. One of her paintings is in the Sainsbury Centre collection.
