= Joan Robins =

British television personality and author

Joan Rafferty Robins OBE (23 November 1908 – 7 April 1994) was a British television personality and author, best known for her cookery programmes.

Born in Battersea, in London, as Joan Godfrey, she was brought up in a Catholic family and was educated at a convent school in Norwich. She later attended the National Training College of Domestic Subjects, and then qualified as a domestic science teacher at Westminster College, London. However, she did not become a teacher, instead working as a receptionist, and then as a home adviser for the Gas Light and Coke Company.

From 1940, Robins was seconded to the Ministry of Food as a nutritionist. Covering the South West of England, she gave demonstration and radio broadcasts, covering how to make nutritious meals using the rations available during World War II. She was also involved in setting up soup kitchens in areas which had been heavily bombed, such as Coventry and Southampton.

Robins returned to the Gas Light and Coke Company in 1947, as its Chief Home Service Adviser; following nationalisation of the industry, she transferred to the North Thames Gas Board. Highly successful at promoting the use of gas appliances, she was given a role with the same title at the Gas Council, and then became head of marketing for British Gas. The Times claimed that she was probably the first woman executive in the gas industry".

During this period, she hosted frequent television cookery programmes, starting with Housewife in the Kitchen in 1947, then For the Housewife, for which she shared presenting duties with Philip Harben. In 1951, she worked with John Yudkin to present a series on weight loss, then next presented About the Home, which covered a wide variety of household topics, from cookery to clothing and fuel use. These series led to her writing several books, including Common-Sense Slimming and Common-Sense Cooking and Eating.

Robins was also interested in women's rights. She regularly appears on Woman's Hour, and from 1959 to 1962 was president of the National Council of Women of Great Britain. During her presidency, she called for women to be consulted more widely on government policy, and as a result, the Women's Consultative Council was formed. She also ran a successful campaign against turnstiles being placed at the entrances to women's toilets. In a profile, The Guardian claimed that "...she is no crusader about anything, and Joan Robins is so effective precisely because she has neither a sense of mission nor is she didactic. She simply uses common sense".

Robins was also active in the National Board of Catholic Women, was the founding president of the Institute of Home Economics, and treasurer of the International Council of Women. She was a supporter of the Conservative Party.

In the early 1970s, Robins retired to Deddington in Oxfordshire with her husband. She was also made an Officer of the Order of the British Empire.

Non-profit organization positions
| Preceded by Eva Isaacs, Marchioness of Reading | President of the National Council of Women of Great Britain; 1959–1962 | Succeeded by Nora Deane |
