= Autobiografiction =

Literary genre, a blend of autobiography and fiction

Autobiografiction is a literary fiction genre that blends autobiography with fiction; it fictionalizes autobiographical experiences, often by altering them, attributing them to fictional characters or reinventing them into other experiences. The concept of autobiografiction was invented by Stephen Reynolds in 1906, and then researched and described in depth by Max Saunders in 2010.

== Reynolds' definition ==
According to Reynolds, autobiografiction is a combination of autobiography, fiction, and essay. For a work to be considered autobiografiction, it must be a "record of real spiritual experiences strung on a credible but more or less fictitious autobiographical narrative". Reynolds' understanding of spiritual experience is similar to James Joyce's "epiphany" and Virginia Woolf's "moments of being" because the triggering event does not need to be extraordinary or uncommon but it must affect a person greatly and touch their soul. Reynolds also said autobiografiction is created when neither formal autobiography nor pure fiction nor an essay can be used to communicate the author's feelings and emotions in a truthful and satisfying way and that it is often published anonymously or at least "with some degree of anonymity". According to Max Saunders, these criteria were important to Reynolds as a closeted homosexual man who wrote his essay eleven years after Oscar Wilde's trial. Wilde and other queer writers of the time used autobiografictional techniques to write about queer intimacy while concealing it from censors and making it understandable by those who knew what to look for. Reynolds said autobiografictional works should ideally be inspiring for other people and help them by showing readers they could follow the authors' examples of overcoming problems and hardships. According to Reynolds, this property gives autobiografictional works an influence that is "greater in life than in literature".

== Saunders' definition ==
Max Saunders defines autobiografiction as a genre of autobiographical fiction that was developed between the 1870s and the 1930s, and was frequently explored by modernist writers. According to Saunders, the commonly used term autobiographical fiction is insufficient to describe the special connection between modernism and autobiography.

Reynolds' claim that because autobiografiction is about "combining forms; fusing, blurring, or moving between the forms of autobiography, story, diary, preface, and so on", it is a meeting point between the facts that all fiction is autobiographical and that all autobiography is fictional and therefore both "autobiographical content ... displaced onto a fictionalized narrative form", modernist works that use autobiographical form and combination of them can be qualified as autobiografictional. According to Reynolds, another important feature of autobiografiction is that the self of the author is "the self as created through role-playing, since its writers are consciously and deliberately shifting into the shapes of other subjectivities, and thus revealing the performance involved in the achievement of any subjectivity". Saunders rejects Reynolds' idea that all autobiografictional works should help the readers and give them hope, especially because this criterion was rooted in the zeitgeist of the turn-of-the-century England. Saunders also argues about the inclusion of the essay genre in autobiografiction; he said autobiografiction "reads like an essay" because it deals with only small a part of the author's life rather than its entirety.

== Queer autobiografiction ==
Saunders' study of autobiografiction demonstrates a link between this form and queerness:

[My discussions] also establish how auto/biografiction's masquerades include gender masquerades, making it a mode attractive to writers wanting to queer their picture. Autobiografiction and homoeroticism seem to coincide (for obvious reasons, when to write candid sexual autobiography could land a person in prison).

— Max Saunders, Self Impression: Life-Writing, Autobiografiction, and the Forms of Modern Literature

In her 2007 work The Formation of 20th Century Queer Autobiography, Georgia Johnston writes about a special type of "modernist autobiography as a critique of dominant sexual discourses" and its "manipulation of the autobiographical genre", which is similar to Saunders' concept of "playing games with autobiography". Johnson analyses diaries, letters, and formal autobiographies of queer modernist writers but she also references fictional works. Johnson said the "queer autobiography" as a subgenre of autobiography can also be applied to queer autobiografiction as a subgenre of autobiografiction; several factors analysed by Johnson that influence autobiographies would also influence other autobiographical genres, including autobiografiction.

== See also ==
- Autobiographical novels
- Autofiction
- Biography in literature
- New Narrative
- Roman à clef
