= Beulah London =

British fashion brand

- Industry: Fashion
- Founded: 2010
- Founder: Natasha Isaacs & Lavinia Brennan
- Headquarters: London, United Kingdom
- Website: beulahlondon.com

Beulah London is a British fashion brand founded by Natasha Isaacs and Lavinia Brennan.

== History ==
Beulah London is a "socially conscious" fashion brand founded in 2010 by Natasha Isaacs and Lavinia Brennan. The company uses luxury fabrics and has made commitments to empowering women affected by human trafficking. Initial funding for the company came from family and personal investments. In late 2011, the company announced that fashion retailer Oscar Pinto-Hervia would be investing in the company and selling their lines in its online outlet.

Customers included Kate Moss, Sienna Miller, Natalia Vodianova, and Sarah Jessica Parker.

== Collapse and Current Status ==
The company declared itself insolvent in April 2020 while owing large sums to many small local businesses. Suppliers alleged that Beulah had deliberately placed large orders despite knowing the company would be unable to pay for them.

As of 2025, the brand is still functioning, with its dresses being worn publicly by Princess Catherine, Princess Beatrice, and others.
