= Albany Medical Center =

Coordinates: 42°39′12.42″N 73°46′31.54″W

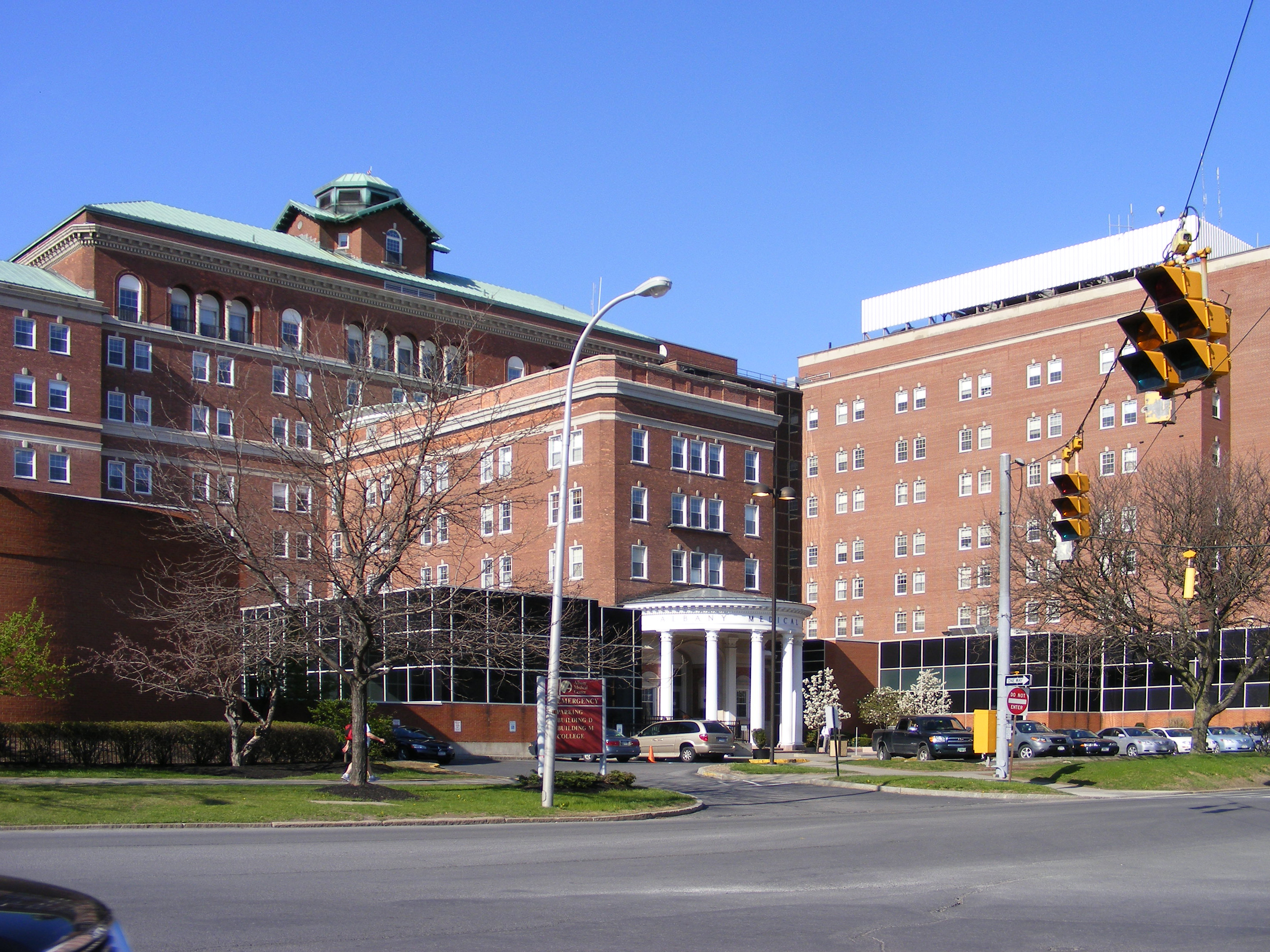
- Albany Medical Center Pillars Entrance

Geography
- Location: 43 New Scotland Avenue, Albany, New York, United States

Organization
- Type: Teaching
- Affiliated university: Albany Medical College

Services
- Emergency department: Level I Adult Trauma Center / Level I Pediatric Trauma Center
- Beds: 766

Helipads
- Helipad: FAA LID: NK64
Number	Length		Surface
Number	ft	m	Surface
H1	40 × 40	12 × 12	asphalt

History
- Founded: 1849

Links
- Website: www.albanymed.org
- Lists: Hospitals in New York State

Albany Medical Center is the only academic medical center serving northeastern New York and western New England. It is the anchor of the Albany Med Health System, a regionally-governed, not-for-profit health system consisting of Albany Medical Center, Albany Medical College, Columbia Memorial Health, Glens Falls Hospital, Saratoga Hospital, and the Visiting Nurses. Albany Medical Center awards the Albany Medical Center Prize, the second-highest value prize in medicine and biomedical research in the United States, annually. Within Albany Medical Center is the Bernard & Millie Duker Children's Hospital that treats infants, children, teens, and young adults throughout the region.

== History ==
In 1839, Dr. Alden March and Dr. James H. Armsby founded Albany Medical College in the former Lancaster School at the corner of Lancaster and Eagle Streets in the City of Albany. Albany Hospital was incorporated in 1849 and established two years later on the southwest corner of Dove Street and Lydius Street (now Madison Avenue). Physicians who taught in the medical school saw patients in the hospital, and students transitioned from lecture halls in the medical school to “shadowing” assignments on the floors of the hospital. The hospital, alongside Albany Medical College, established a radio station that took on the call letters WAMC in 1958; citing financial burdens, the college/hospital sold the radio station in 1981 to an independent entity, and is the primary member station of NPR for the Albany area. In April 2018, the nursing staff voted to unionize and voted to be represented by NYSNA.

=== Weapons incident ===
On March 27, 2023, Albany Medical Center went into lockdown after a man entered the hospital with both a BB gun and a shotgun. The man, Dino Savocca, 61, was visiting his mother when he barricaded himself in the hospital, triggering a code silver and ordering all patients and staff to shelter in place. Savocca was apprehended hours later and arraigned the next day on charges of criminal possession of a weapon, kidnapping and menacing. While there were no casualties, hospital staff criticized management for not seriously considering proposed safety measures.

=== Expansion ===
In June 2025, the hospital announced plans for a $25 million emergency department expansion due to the current emergency department having some of the longest wait times in the nation.

== New York State Department of Health designations ==
- Regional Trauma Center
- Comprehensive Stroke Center
- Regional Perinatal Center
- AIDS Center

== Albany Medical College ==
Albany Medical College (AMC) is a medical school located in Albany, New York. It was founded in 1839 by Alden March and James H. Armsby and is one of the oldest medical schools in the nation. The college is part of Albany Medical Center, which includes the Albany Medical Center Hospital.
