= Thalia C. Eley =

British psychologist

Thalia Catherine Eley FBA FMedSci
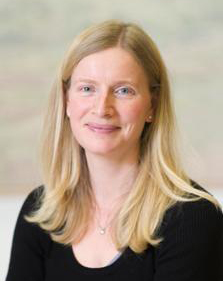
- King's College portrait, 2013
- Born: 9 September 1971 (age 55)
- Education: Cambridge University; University College London
- Occupation: Psychologist
- Known for: Development of anxiety and depression

Thalia Catherine Eley (born 9 September 1971) is a British psychologist who is a Professor of Developmental Behavioural Genetics at the Institute of Psychiatry's MRC Social, Genetic and Developmental Psychiatry Centre, King's College London. Her work focuses on the interplay between genetic and environmental factors on the development and treatment of anxiety and depression.

== Early life ==
Eley was born on 9 September 1971 in Roehampton, England. She is the daughter of Sarzi and Piers Eley, a former director of Nordic Bank, who also attended Trinity College. Her brother Damian was a choral scholar of Clare College, singing bass. Thalia also sings.

Her grandfather was Sir Geoffrey Eley, linked to the Eley Limited ammunition company. Her maternal great-grandfather was Sir Frederic Wake-Walker, whose son, being Thalia's great-uncle, married the sister of the father of Diana, Princess of Wales.

== Academic career ==
Eley began her academic career studying BA Psychology (1989-1992) at Cambridge University. She then undertook her PhD at University College London's Institute of Child Health; her thesis is entitled 'Aetiology of emotional symptoms in childhood and adolescence: Depression and anxiety in twins'.

== Employment ==
Eley held a post-doctoral position at the Institute of Psychiatry's SGDP from 1996-98. Following this she was funded by two Medical Research Council (MRC, UK) fellowships; the first as Research Training Fellow with the status of Lecturer (1999-2002) and the second as Research Fellow as Senior Lecturer (2002–08). From 2008-09 Dr Eley was Senior Lecturer at the SGDP, then Reader in Developmental Behavioural Genetics from 2009-2013. In April 2013 Eley was made Professor at the IoP, where she directs the Emotional Development, Intervention and Treatment lab EDITlab.

== Research background ==
Eley specialises in both gene-environment interactions on the development of anxiety and depression and she has considered the role of cognitive biases in the development of anxiety and depression in the context of genetically sensitive designs, using both quantitative and molecular genetic approaches.

Currently her twin research includes continuing analyses of the longitudinal twin study, G1219. She is also working with Tom McAdams using the “Children of Twins” approach to investigate the transmission of anxiety and depression from parents to children. Her molecular work currently focuses on two projects exploring the role of specific genetic markers in response to psychological therapies, including cognitive-behaviour therapy for child anxiety and exposure therapy for adult phobias. Regarding cognitive biases, she is currently working on attention bias modification in child anxiety.

== Honours and awards ==
Eley was awarded the Spearman Medal for outstanding published work in psychology within 10 years of graduation, from the British Psychological Society (2002), for work published from her PhD thesis. Eley was awarded the Lilly-Molecular Psychiatry Award for the best original research submitted by a young investigator (2004) for her work on the role of gene-environment interactions and the development of anxiety and depression. Papers published on her childhood anxiety study led to Eley being awarded the Macquarie University Research Excellence Award (2011). On 1 April 2013 Eley was made Professor at the Institute of Psychiatry.

Eley was elected a Fellow of the Academy of Medical Sciences in 2021 and a Fellow of the British Academy in 2025.
