= Gerald Isaacs, 2nd Marquess of Reading =

British noble

Lieutenant-Colonel The Most Honourable The Marquess of Reading GCMG CBE MC TD PC QC

Minister of State for Foreign Affairs
- In office 11 November 1953 – 9 January 1957
- Monarch: Elizabeth II
- Prime Minister: Sir Winston Churchill; Anthony Eden
- Preceded by: Selwyn Lloyd
- Succeeded by: David Ormsby-Gore

Parliamentary Under-Secretary of State for Foreign Affairs
- In office 31 October 1951 – 11 November 1953
- Monarchs: George VI; Elizabeth II
- Prime Minister: Sir Winston Churchill
- Preceded by: The Lord Handerson
- Succeeded by: Douglas Dodds-Parker

Member of the House of Lords Lord Temporal
- In office 30 December 1935 – 19 September 1960; Hereditary Peerage
- Preceded by: The 1st Marquess of Reading
- Succeeded by: The 3rd Marquess of Reading

Personal details
- Born: 10 December 1889
- Died: 19 September 1960 (aged 70)
- Spouse: Hon. Eva Violet Mond (m. 1914)
- Children: Michael Alfred Rufus Isaacs, 3rd Marquess of Reading; Lady Joan Isaacs; Lady Elizabeth Isaacs
- Parent(s): Rufus Isaacs, 1st Marquess of Reading; Alice Edith Cohen
- Education: Rugby School
- Alma mater: Balliol College, Oxford (MA)

Gerald Rufus Isaacs, 2nd Marquess of Reading GCMG CBE MC TD PC QC (10 December 1889 – 19 September 1960), styled Viscount Erleigh from 1917 to 1935, was a British barrister and Liberal then Conservative politician.

== Background and education ==
Gerald Rufus Isaacs was the son of Rufus Isaacs, 1st Marquess of Reading, and Alice Edith Cohen. He was educated at Rugby School and Balliol College, Oxford. He served in the First World War, earning the Military Cross in the 1918 Birthday Honours and reaching the rank of lieutenant colonel. His book The South Sea Bubble which describes the famous speculative boom and crash of shares in 18th century England, was published in 1933.

== Political career ==
Erleigh followed his father into Liberal politics. He stood as Liberal candidate for Blackburn at the 1929 General Election. He succeeded his father as second Marquess of Reading in 1935. When the Conservatives came to power in 1951 under Winston Churchill, he was appointed Joint Parliamentary Under-Secretary of State for Foreign Affairs, a post he held until 1953, when he was promoted to Minister of State for Foreign Affairs and admitted to the Privy Council. He retained this position when Anthony Eden became Prime Minister in 1955. However, Reading was not included in the administration formed by Harold Macmillan in January 1957 and never returned to ministerial office. Apart from his political career, he was also a Bencher and Treasurer of the Middle Temple and an Honorary Colonel in the Inns of Court Regiment from 1947 to 1959. He was first Chairman of the Council on Tribunals serving from its inception in December 1958 until his death. He was succeeded by Gwilym Lloyd George, son of David Lloyd George.

== Family ==
Lord Reading married the Honourable Eva Violet Mond in 1914, daughter of Alfred Moritz Mond, 1st Baron Melchett (1868–1930) and Violet Mond, Baroness Melchett (1867–1945). Eva Violet Mond's grandfather, Ludwig Mond (1839–1909), was a chemist and industrialist who created the Mond process to extract and purify nickel. He died in September 1960, aged 70, and was cremated at Golders Green Crematorium. His ashes, like those of his father, are buried in the Golders Green Jewish Cemetery.

He was succeeded in his titles by his son Michael. The Marchioness of Reading died in 1973.

In 1939, Lord Reading's daughter, Lady Joan Isaacs, was a painter who married the scientist Solly Zuckerman, Baron Zuckerman, OM, KCB, FRS (1904–1993). She died in 2000.

== Arms ==
Coat of arms of Gerald Isaacs, 2nd Marquess of Reading
Coronet Coronet of a marquess. Crest In front of a leopard's head couped sable, a fasces as in the arms. Escutcheon Sable, a bend between two leopards' faces or, on a chief argent a fasces fessewise proper. Supporters On either side a leopard proper, round the neck a collar or, pendant therefrom an escutcheon argent charged with a human head affrontée proper erased at the neck, ducally crowned proper. Motto Aut nunquam tentes, aut perspice (Either do not attempt, or complete). Orders Order of St.Michael and St.George (Knight Grand Cross - GCMG); Order of the British Empire (Commander - CBE); Military Cross (MC).

Political offices
Preceded by The Lord Henderson; Ernest Davies	Joint Under-Secretary of State for Foreign Affairs with Anthony Nutting; 1951–1953	Succeeded by Anthony Nutting; Douglas Dodds-Parker
Preceded by Selwyn Lloyd	Joint Minister of State for Foreign Affairs with Selwyn Lloyd 1953–1954; Anthony Nutting 1954–1956; Allan Noble 1956–1957; 1953–1957	Succeeded by Allan Noble; Hon. David Ormsby-Gore
Peerage of the United Kingdom
Preceded by Rufus Isaacs	Marquess of Reading; 1935–1960	Succeeded by Michael Isaacs
