= Alfred Cohen =

American artist

Alfred Cohen (1920–2001) was an American artist whose art was firmly rooted in the European tradition; he was inspired in particular by the commedia dell'arte; and by the colour and handling of the Post-Impressionists and Expressionists.

== Biography ==
Cohen was born on May 9, 1920, in Chicago. His father, a furniture dealer, had emigrated from Latvia to America, where he married the daughter of another Latvian emigre.

Cohen attended the Art Institute of Chicago, but left to enlist in the US Army Air Forces. He served from 1942 to 1945 as a navigator in Flying Fortresses and Liberators based in the Pacific Theater.

After the war Cohen returned to the Art Institute, where he studied under Louis Ritman, Boris Anisfeld (who collaborated with Léon Bakst) and Egon Weiner. In 1949 he was awarded a fellowship to study in Europe, where he was to spend the rest of his life. He lived in France and Germany, and travelled widely throughout the Continent. Cohen and his first wife, Virginia Adler, lived in Sam Francis' old studio on the Boulevard Arago in Paris, where he studied at the Académie de la Grande Chaumière.

== Artistic career ==
Cohen's work was representational and figurative, owing most to Raoul Dufy, Bonnard, Marc Chagall, Oskar Kokoschka, Georges Rouault and Chaïm Soutine. His favourite subjects were ports and river banks, vibrant flower compositions and searching portraits. .

In the 1950s Cohen staged one-man exhibitions in Germany and Paris. French critics described him as an "intimist", "ranking among our best painters", and hailing his paintings as "good, direct and natural". In 1958 he had his first one-man exhibition at the Ben Uri in London, where two years later he decided to settle. His exhibition at the Obelisk Gallery in 1960 was the first of several sell-out shows in Britain.

Cohen had already met with considerable success in Germany and France. But with the large canvases of his Aspects of the Thames exhibition in 1961 Cohen really began to win critical acclaim in Britain too.

Alfred Cohen, Docklands Night, 1961, oil on canvas, 28 x 36 in; 71.1 x 91.4 cm; private collection; on loan to the Alfred Cohen Art Foundation

Anita Brookner wrote in the Burlington Magazine that Cohen was "a fresh and accessible artist of considerable accomplishment, whose abstract impressionist compositions were enlivened by an acute charm of colour." The Tatler admired "the rich sense of colour that makes his work immediately striking and lastingly memorable" and again noted the combination of abstract design and representation which remained important throughout his career: "Look (...) at almost any few square inches of a Cohen canvas and you have a little gem of abstract painting." Edward Lucie-Smith, in Arts Review, found the paintings "strikingly well constructed", adding: "the architecture is nearly always firm and logical. . . . I admire these pictures most as virtuoso demonstrations of technical skill. They have immense panache and glitter, and yet they are self-consistent." The New Daily appreciated the "visionary quality" of their effects of light.

Cohen followed this with an exhibition at the Brook Street Gallery in 1963, on the theme of the commedia dell'arte. The Daily Telegraph described the technical achievement of his images as "formidable", and declared him "one of the best draughtsmen at work today", adding that "Only Picasso in one or two early works has in our time touched such depths through the characters of the Commedia dell'Arte." Conroy Maddox, wrote in Arts Review that "The paintings are a show of force and theatricality (...) Cohen has certainly gained a sensuous richness and a robust and vigorous way of handling his material."

Alfred Cohen, Polichinelle (Red Punch), 1963, acrylic on hardboard, 40 x 30 in; 101.6 x 76.2 cm. Alfred Cohen Art Foundation

The inspiration of the commedia dell'arte was to recur throughout Cohen's work. But once again he resisted the temptation to repeat a successful formula, and completely reinvented his painting yet again. Now he turned his attention to the landscape of Kent, where he settled with his second wife, Diana Saunders, in 1963. His exhibition of "Recent Paintings" at the Brook Street Gallery in 1965 sounded a note that was to remain important in Cohen's work, focusing on the English countryside and country people. His attraction to Britain never waned. "I don't want to leave it. America is no longer my home. I feel more of a foreigner there than I do anywhere in Europe." But he was also attempting to capture the features of the land that most perplexed him. First, its postwar air of decline: "It is crumbling from the inside, and crumbling in style. It's elegant, but there's danger in the elegance." But also the challenge represented by its crowded seclusion. As the writer Philip Oakes explains: "He evolved a new style, using paint like a sculptor, laying down slabs of colour, carving it with his brush so that the fields and hedges and houses seemed to be hewn from the canvas."

Cohen's British landscapes were well-received too, with critics continuing to praise his compositional intelligence. Pictures on Exhibit said:

There are very few artists of today's generation with the ability to synthesise the quality of 20th Century Ecole de l'Europe in the sense that the late impressionists and the post-impressionists did it for their epoch. Alfred Cohen is one of them, and maybe this explains his success with a wide category of collectors. Their enthusiasm is unstinting (...) There are few enough painters like [Cohen] nowadays; hardly one capable of capturing the British scene in such an attractive and authoritative way.

Cohen had nine one-man exhibitions in London, and others in Heidelberg, Hannover, Paris, Toronto, Montreal, Tokyo, Cape Town, Belfast, and many other cities and towns in England, including Cambridge, York, Harrogate, Leeds, Rye, and King's Lynn. He had two-person exhibitions with Josef Herman, Patrick Hall, and Mary Newcomb. And his work was also included in many international mixed exhibitions, such as one at the U.S. Embassy in London of Five Americans in Britain, with R. B. Kitaj and others.

Alfred Cohen, Near Goudhurst, 1965, oil on board, 9.75 x 11.in; 24.8 x 29.9 cm. Private Collection.

In the late 1960s he joined Roland, Browse and Delbanco, in Cork Street, which combined exhibitions of artists such as Rodin and Matthew Smith with work from contemporary artists such as Phillip Sutton, Keith Grant and Cohen's friend Josef Herman. The first of his four exhibitions there was in 1969. It continued the exploration of the country. "He was always effective and satisfying", wrote The Jewish Chronicle, "but his Kentish landscapes have been a consistent breakthrough . . . . He has things in common with several good artists, but most noticeable with what de Stael might have painted had he been able to sustain himself at his best. For Cohen now uses that thick impasto in jewel-like colour-blocks that are subtly balanced. The variety of blues and greens, and of reds, that he can weigh in his balance is astonishing." But he also began to return to the Channel coast, seen from both sides, and in new ways. James Burr, in Apollo, noted:

Many subjects have engaged the expressionist fervour of Alfred Cohen; in these recent paintings, the boats and houses of the coastlines of France predominate. He reacts with a fierce passion to direct experience that is organized into a formal structure. . . . His emotional power and exuberantly vigorous response infuses his paintings with an intensity that makes much contemporary expressionism look feeble.

Alfred Cohen, Coastal Picture, 1966, oil on board, 8 x 10 in; 20.3 x 25.4 cm. Private Collection.

It was this return to coastal paintings that was to characterize much of his later work. Marina Vaizey reviewed his second show at Roland, Browse and Delbanco in 1972 for the Financial Times, commenting on how the works "play on the borders of abstract and representational art", and noting: "He is particularly fond of a deep range of blues, and sea-greens, and the compositions have a deliberate naiveté that is charming but never cloying." The Jewish Chronicle said: "Like Marquet, Cohen paints beautifully, but more warmly. . . a man who is passionately concerned about painting well, and who has also a first-rate sense of colour, deep and rich, belonging to the earth and the sea." Of Cohen's last exhibition with Roland's in 1976, Brian Wallworth wrote in Arts Review:

Paintings and drawings of astonishing vivacity and assurance. . . . Each one is a fully resolved picture of an obviously very intense visual sensation felt by the artist. . . . delicious . . . What a perceptive, revealing and loving eye this American turns on the people, places and atmospheres of Kent! . . . there is a fine wildness about Cohen's pictures that instantly commands attention. . . .

Alfred Cohen, Folkestone, 1974–75, oil on hardboard, 16 x 20 in; 40.6 x 50.8 cm. Private Collection.

That exhibition represented yet another new departure. As Peter Stone wrote: "Alfred Cohen is unique. I can think of no other artist whom I have followed since his beginning and found to be literally better in each succeeding exhibition. . . . Here is a new line of free and easy drawings of characters like cartoons. You can't pass them without a chuckle."

In the mid-1970s Cohen took up print-making. His hand-coloured etchings, often of flowers, were sold worldwide. He also turned his sense of space and design to the renovation of houses. In 1978 he and Diana moved to Wighton, north Norfolk, where they converted an old schoolhouse into a studio, print workshop, and art gallery. They later discovered that this was the house where Henry Moore had lived as an art student in the 1920s, and where he had begun to sculpt. When landscaping the garden, the Cohens unearthed a marble carving that had been left unfinished and they returned it to Moore. The gallery made them friends, notably Joan Zuckerman, who was a well connected artist. Diana gave Zuckerman an exhibition and they were then surprised to receive a day's notice of a visit by the Queen Mother and her entourage including John Julius Norwich.

Like many painters, he loved the light in Norfolk, its skies, and above all its coast. He often exhibited there. Tony Warner found his exhibition at the King's Lynn arts centre in 1991 "invigorating", describing how it: "glows with colour. . . . There is an obvious joy in the visual world. . . . each painting is carefully crafted. Layers of paint build up to an intricate pattern of complementary colours. The structures are worked out with an almost mathematical precision, each part firmly measured against the painting as a whole." Of his only one-man exhibition at the School House Gallery, in 1994, the Eastern Daily Press commented: "Alfred Cohen is recognized as one of the finest colourists and draughtsmen living in England. . . ." His collectors latterly included Sir Keith Joseph, Judge Stephen Tumim, Lord and Lady Norwich, and John Madden.

Cohen continued painting, drawing, etching, and producing screenprints, collages, and assemblages up until his death, on January 25, 2001, at King's Lynn. While the paint surfaces became flatter, less illusionistic, their materiality more insistent, his attention to effects of light, water, and colour, was as intense as ever.

Alfred Cohen, Catia's Terrace, 1991, oil on canvas, 22 x 25 in; 55.9 x 63.5 cm. Private Collection.

== Reception ==
Obituaries appeared in all the major broadsheets. The Times praised his "vibrant flower compositions and searching portraits", as well as his "evocative scenes of the Thames". The Independent recalled that "Once in Europe he . . . made his reputation in its galleries, where his unmistakably chunky, jewel-like canvases were for several decades much sought-after." The Daily Telegraph concurred, recording how "His work became increasingly sought after, by such notable collectors as James Mason, Stanley Baker, and Sam Wanamaker", adding: "A gregarious man, and a friend to many other artists, Cohen also possessed a photographic memory and an encyclopaedic knowledge of Hollywood cinema. His conversation, like his art, bubbled with wit and satire. He hated pomposity or prejudice and was passionately liberal in his beliefs." The Jewish Chronicle described how he "produced a prodigious number of vibrant and colourful paintings. . . . Well received in France, he was equally acclaimed when he moved to London. . . . His hand-coloured etchings . . . were popular in Europe, the US and Japan." And the Guardian called him "a brilliant colourist and deft draughtsman", admiring his "vibrant oils of the Seine, the Thames and the Channel ports, and some telling portraits", as well as his "restless energy" and the wit of his cartoons and constructions.

Two retrospective exhibitions have since been held: the first at the School House Gallery from May–June 2001; the second at the London Jewish Cultural Centre from October 2001 – March 2002. Derek Gillman, Director of the Pennsylvania Academy of Fine Art, wrote for the first: "He was a grand artist, a great colourist, a forceful designer, and a highly acute observer of places and people. He also made very fine prints, with the same intelligence and wit." Lady Vaizey, opening the London exhibition, spoke of how Cohen's work was "filled with warmth, life, affection, pleasure in the beauties and good realities of the present day." Howard Jacobson, in the Independent, praised his "wonderfully violent paintings":

he painted sensuously, in paint rather than in epigrams, and, like many of the best artists still alive in the last quarter of the 20th century, had to take a back seat to that institutionalised facetiousness we know as conceptualism. . . . It should, of course, be Tate Modern that exhibits him, but he's a little hot for their whitened aesthetic. . . . And not only too hot, but too possessed of the satiric daemon. For me, although you can see the influences of Vuillard and Kokoschka and Soutine on Cohen, his best work has Daumier behind it, the vigorousness of caricature and the savage grotesqueries of the commedia dell'arte. . .

Alfred Cohen, 'The Entrance of Punch', 1963, oil on canvas, 40 x 32 in; 101.6 x 81.3 cm. Alfred Cohen Art Foundation.

Alfred Cohen's work is represented in the Ben Uri Art Society, Bradford City Art Gallery, British Council, The Castle Museum Norwich, The Contemporary Art Society, The Department of the Environment, Eastern Arts, Ein Harod Museum (Israel), Essex and Bedfordshire County Councils, Ferens Gallery (Hull), Fitzwilliam Museum, Cambridge, Girton College, Cambridge, The Government Art Collection, Lancaster University, Maidstone Museum and Bentlif Art Gallery, Musée d'Art Moderne d'Eilat, National Collection of the French Government, Norfolk Contemporary Arts Society, The Nuffield Foundation, Pallant House Gallery, Pembroke College Oxford, Rye Art Gallery, Smart Museum, University of Chicago, Spertus Museum, Chicago, The Stanley and Audrey Burton Gallery, University of Leeds, The Stanley Picker Trust, Sainsbury Centre for Visual Arts, University of East Anglia, St Paul Art Gallery, Minnesota, South East Arts, The Trianon Press, Paris, Trinity College Oxford, Tunbridge Wells Museum and Art Gallery, University of Wisconsin, and Wolfson College Oxford.

The Alfred Cohen Art Foundation (Registered Charity No. 1097812) was established as a charitable trust in 2001. It is based in Cohen's last home, The School House Gallery, Wighton, Near Wells-next-the-Sea, Norfolk NR23 1AL.

The book Alfred Cohen -- An American Artist in Europe: Between Figuration and Abstraction, edited by Max Saunders and Sarah MacDougall (London: Ben Uri Exhibitions /Wighton: The Alfred Cohen Art Foundation, 2020) was published to accompany a centenary programme of exhibitions in London and Norfolk.

The Alfred Cohen Museum opened in 2023 in the artist's studios at the School House, Wighton, Norfolk.
