= Marquess of Reading =

Title in the Peerage of the United Kingdom

Marquessate of Reading
- Arms: Sable, a Bend between two Leopard’s Faces Or, on a Chief Argent, a Fasces fesswise proper. Crest: In front of a Leopard’s Head couped Sable, a Fasces fesswise proper. Supporters: On either side a Leopard proper, gorged with a Collar Or, pendent therefrom an Escutcheon Argent, charged with a Human Head affrontée proper, erased at the neck and ducally crowned Or.
- Creation date: 7 May 1926
- Created by: King George V
- Peerage: United Kingdom
- First holder: Rufus Isaacs, 1st Marquess of Reading
- Present holder: Julian Isaacs, 5th Marquess of Reading
- Heir presumptive: Antony Isaacs
- Subsidiary titles: Earl of Reading; Viscount Reading; Viscount Erleigh; Baron Reading
- Status: Extant
- Former seat: Jaynes Court
- Motto: AUT NUNQUAM TENTES AUT PERFICE (Either succeed or do not try)

Marquess of Reading is a title in the Peerage of the United Kingdom. It was created in 1926 for Rufus Isaacs, who had been Member of Parliament for Reading between 1904 and 1913, before serving as Viceroy of India and Lord Chief Justice of England and Wales. He had already been created Baron Reading, of Erleigh in the County of Berkshire, in 1914, Viscount Reading, of Erleigh in the County of Berkshire, in 1916, and Viscount Erleigh, of Erleigh in the County of Berkshire, and Earl of Reading, in 1917.

The marquessate of Reading is the highest title in the British peerage ever attained by a Jew, and is the most recently created extant marquessate in the Peerage of the United Kingdom (that of Willingdon was created in 1936 but became extinct in 1979). In this role, the marquessate of Reading is currently the junior-most marquessate in the Order of precedence in England and Wales.

Upon the death of the 1st Marquess of Reading, he was succeeded by his son, the second marquess. He notably held ministerial office from 1951 to 1957 in the Conservative administrations of Winston Churchill and Anthony Eden. As of 2026, the titles are held by his great-grandson, the fifth marquess, who succeeded his father in 2026. The family seat was Jaynes Court, near Bisley, Gloucestershire.

In May 1804, the title of Baron Reading was offered to the outgoing prime minister, Henry Addington, who had many links with the largely pre-industrialised town, as a subsidiary title of the customary retirement earldom for prime ministers. However, Addington refused the honour, though later accepting a peerage as Viscount Sidmouth.

== Marquesses of Reading (1926) ==
Other titles (1st Marquess onwards): Baron Reading (UK, 1914), Viscount Reading (UK, 1916), Viscount Erleigh (UK, 1917), Earl of Reading (UK, 1917)

- Rufus Daniel Isaacs, 1st Marquess of Reading (1860–1935)
- Gerald Rufus Isaacs, 2nd Marquess of Reading (1889–1960)
- Michael Alfred Rufus Isaacs, 3rd Marquess of Reading (1916–1980)
- Simon Charles Henry Rufus Isaacs, 4th Marquess of Reading (1942–2026)
- Julian Michael Rufus Isaacs, 5th Marquess of Reading (born 1986)

The heir presumptive is the present holder's uncle, Antony Rufus Isaacs (born 1943).

Line of succession
- Michael Isaacs, 3rd Marquess of Reading (1916–1980)
  - Simon Charles Henry Rufus Isaacs, 4th Marquess of Reading (1942 – 2026)
    - Julian Rufus Isaacs, 5th Marquess of Reading (born 1986)
  - (1) Lord Antony Rufus Isaacs (born 1943)
  - (2) Lord Alexander Rufus Isaacs (born 1957)

== Coat of Arms ==
Arms of the Marquess of Reading

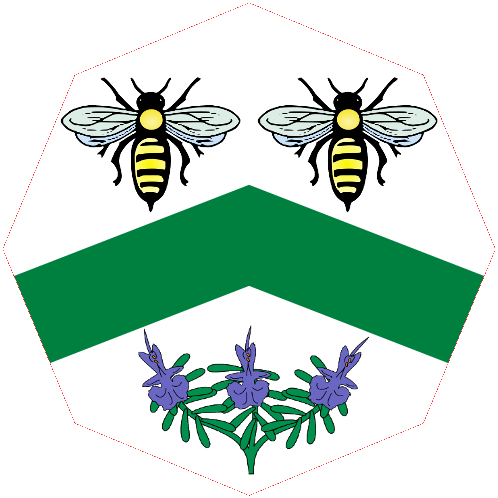
Lozenge of arms of the Baroness Swanborough

== See also ==
- Earl of Banbury
