= Tots and Quots =

The Tots and Quots was a dining club for scientists and other intellectuals that was based in London and was active from 1931 to 1946. It was founded by Solly Zuckerman and went through two periods of activity, one from 1931 to 1933, and a second period when Zuckerman revived the club in November 1939. Most of the activity of the second period took place between 1940 and 1943, but the club was not disbanded until 1946 when increasing political divergence and limitations on Zuckerman's time made the organisation no longer viable.

The name "Tots and Quots" was chosen as an abbreviation of the Latin phrase "Quot homines, tot sententiae" ('there are as many opinions as there are people', or literally 'as many men, so many opinions'), with the words tot and quot being inadvertently placed in the wrong order.

== Notable members ==
- J. D. Bernal
- Richard Crossman
- James Crowther
- Solly Zuckerman, Baron Zuckerman
