= Geoffrey Eley =

British businessman and author

Sir Geoffrey Eley CBE JP FLS
- Sir Geoffrey Eley, October 1964
- Born: Geoffrey Cecil Ryves Eley; 18 July 1904; East Bergholt, Suffolk, England
- Died: 17 May 1990 (aged 85); Braintree, Essex, England
- Education: Eton College
- Alma mater: Trinity College, Cambridge
- Occupations: Banker, businessman
- Spouse: Penelope Hughes Wake-Walker
- Relatives: Maxwell Eley (brother)

Sir Geoffrey Cecil Ryves Eley CBE JP FLS (18 July 1904 – 17 May 1990) was a British businessman and writer. He served as a director of the Bank of England, and as High Sheriff of both the County of London and the City of London.

== Early life and education ==
Eley was born in East Bergholt, Suffolk, one of four sons born to Charles Cuthbert Eley, a barrister and noted gardener, and Ethel Maxwell Ryves. His great-grandfather William Eley co-founded the Eley Brothers. He was the younger brother of Maxwell Eley, a gold medalist in rowing at the 1924 Summer Olympics. He was educated at Eton College and Trinity College, Cambridge (BA, 1925; MA, 1947). He also studied at Harvard University in 1925 and 1926.

== Career ==
He was appointed a Commander of the Order of the British Empire (CBE) in the 1947 Birthday Honours for his services following the war, when he was Director of Overseas Disposals, Ministry of Supply. In 1948 he was appointed a part time member of the London Electricity Board, remaining a member until 1956. He was appointed to the Court of Directors for the Bank of England in 1949. He was knighted in the 1964 Birthday Honours.

He was chairman of the Brush Group, Ltd., Heinemann Group of Publishers Ltd., Richard Thomas and Baldwins and Thomas Tilling.

He also served as High Sheriff of the County of London in 1954 and 1955, and High Sheriff of Greater London in 1966 and 1967.

In 1979 the book The Birmingham Heritage was published. He had co-written this with Joan Zuckerman. The book carried a foreword written by the politician, Roy Jenkins.

== Personal life ==
In 1937, he married Penelope Hughes Wake-Walker, daughter of Admiral Sir Frederic Wake-Walker and Muriel, daughter of Sir Collingwood Hughes, 10th Baronet. They had two sons and two daughters. His youngest daughter, Chloë Sarabella, married Richard Christian Wynne Fremantle, grandson of Thomas Fremantle, 3rd Baron Cottesloe. Another granddaughter is Thalia C. Eley.

He is buried in the cemetery at East Bergholt in Suffolk.

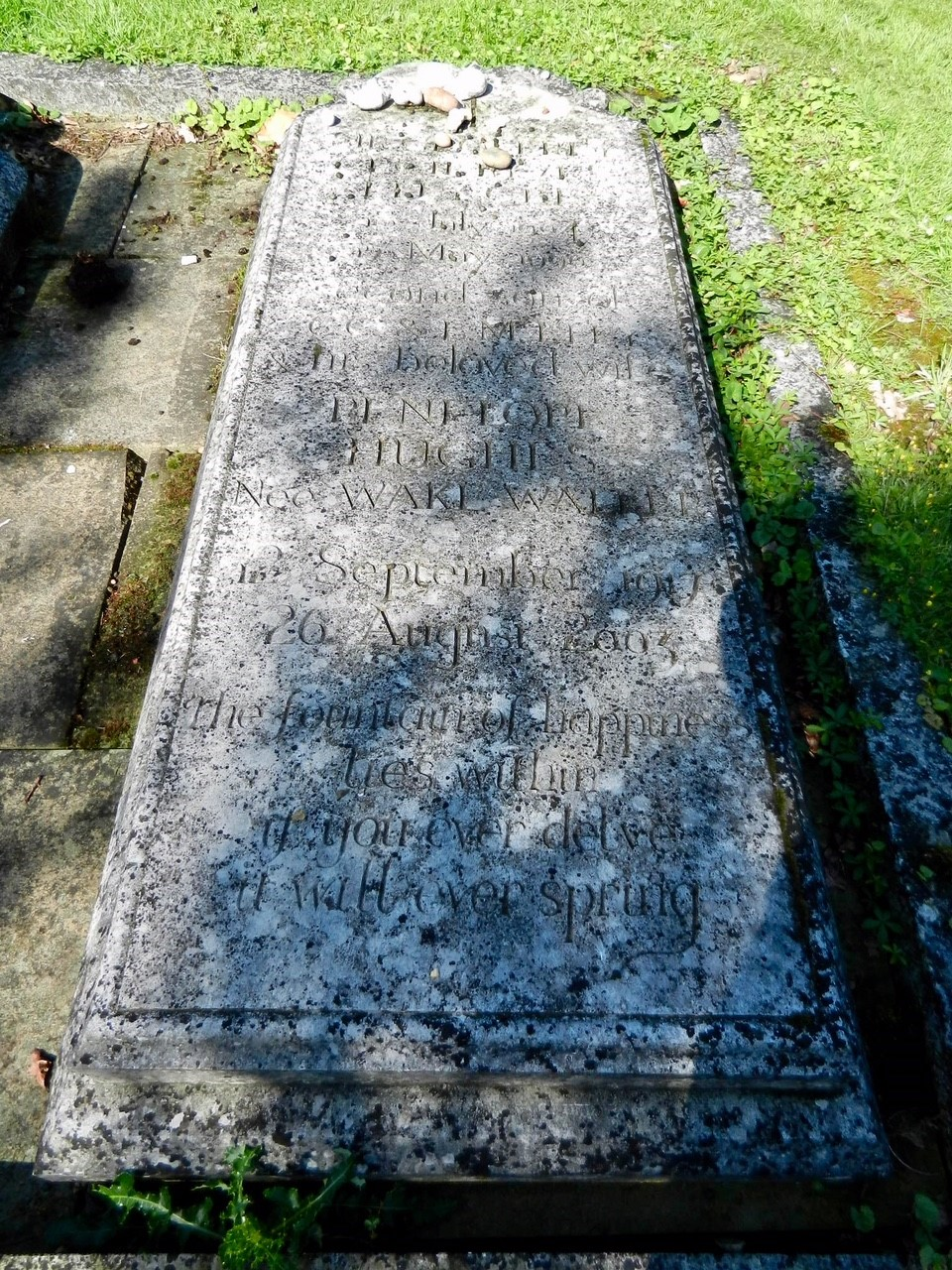
The grave of Geoffrey Eley in East Bergholt Cemetery, Suffolk.

Honorary titles
Preceded by Michael Babington Smith	High Sheriff of the County of London; 1954–1955	Succeeded by William Antony Acton
Preceded by Charles Howard Kerridge Fisher	High Sheriff of Greater London; 1966–1967	Succeeded by Sir Theodore Constantine
