= Glens Falls Hospital =

New York (state) hospital

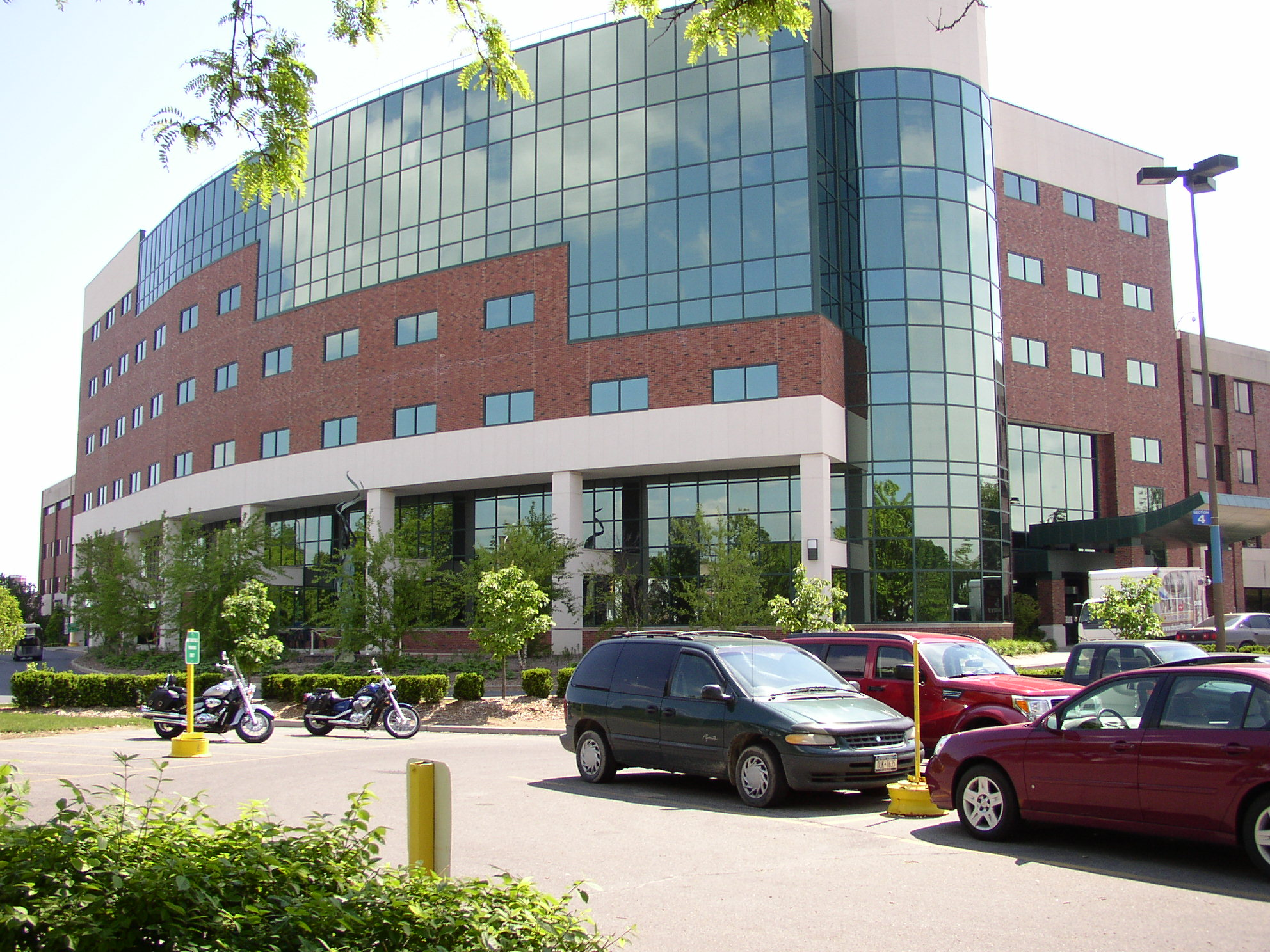
- The Northwest Tower of Glens Falls Hospital

Geography
- Location: 100 Park Street, Glens Falls, New York, United States
- Coordinates: 43°18′23″N 73°38′48″W

Organization
- Care system: Medicare and Medicaid
- Funding: Not-for-profit
- Type: Community

Services
- Standards: Joint Commission accredited; Licensed by New York State Department of Health
- Beds: 410

History
- Opened: 1897

Links
- Website: www.glensfallshospital.org
- Lists: Hospitals in New York State

Glens Falls Hospital is a 410-bed not-for-profit community hospital located in Glens Falls, New York. It serves the communities in Warren, Washington, Hamilton, Essex and northern Saratoga and Rensselaer counties. The hospital operates 28 off-campus health care facilities throughout the region. The hospital is the largest employer in the region with over 2,800 employees. In 2019, the hospital affiliated with Albany Medical Center.

== History ==
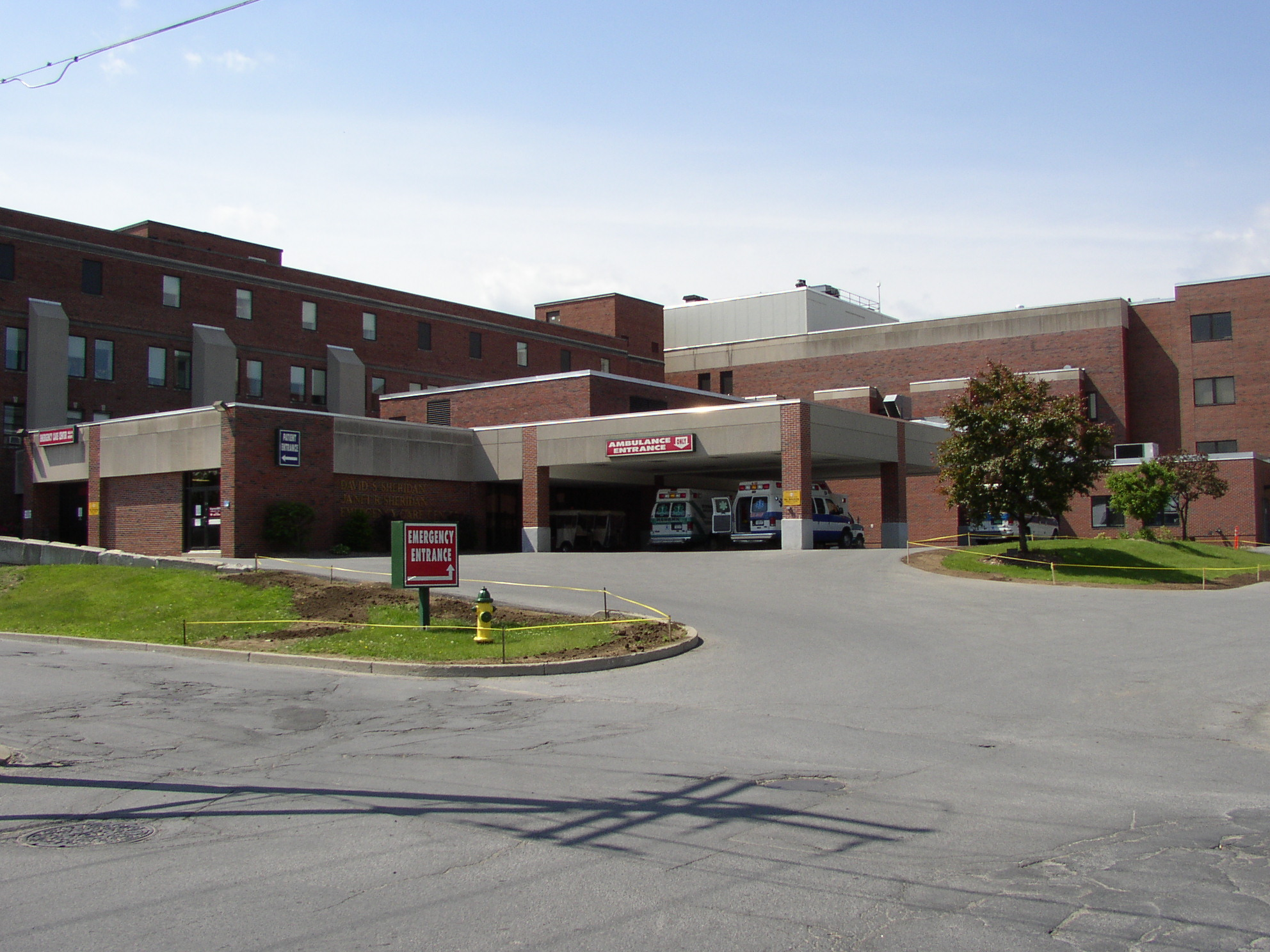
The David S. and Janet R. Sheridan Emergency Care Center

The hospital was incorporated in 1897 and established at the residence of Solomon A. Parks at 48 Park Street. It came to be known as Parks Hospital. The hospital had two wards (one male, one female) consisting of 15 beds total initially. Patient treatment began in 1900. Glens Falls Hospital School of Nursing was established a few years later, although it closed in the 1930s as a result of the Great Depression. The hospital's name was officially changed to Glens Falls Hospital in 1909.

A donation of $5,000 was left to the hospital in 1933.

The hospital has undergone several expansion projects, notably: a west wing was added in 1950; an east wing in 1962; a west tower in 1975; the Pruyn Pavilion in 1993; and the Northwest Tower in 2005.

In 2010, Glens Falls Hospital received nearly $2 million in extra Medicare money as part of a $400 million nationwide adjustment for those hospitals with lower costs.

In 2011, a helistop was constructed outside the Emergency Care Center to provide more efficient air transfers to other medical centers. What was once city streets and residences had become part of the hospital campus, having been acquired as the region's medical needs grew.

In 2018, the hospital enacted a new policy requiring visitors to show ID. They closed their overnight children's unit in 2019; "children who cannot be treated as outpatients are transferred to Albany Medical Center Hospital. The 2020 follow-up to this arrangement, which affects those below age 16, including sick newborns, is affiliation with Albany Medical, making it "the parent hospital" including decision-making power over the hospital's expenditures and even hiring and firing of management-level employees.

== Controversy ==
A 2019 audit of 2017 billing showed that the hospital did not bill for $38 million of services to which it was entitled; the hospital's year ended with a $30 million deficit.
