= Margot Isaacs, Marchioness of Reading =

British aristocrat and campaigner (1919–2015)

The Most Honourable The Marchioness of Reading
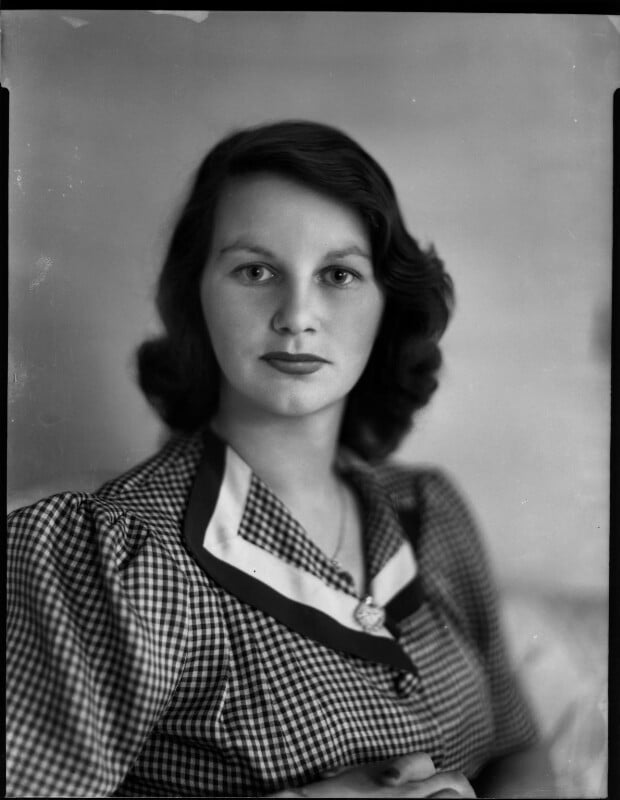
- Margot, then Viscountess Erleigh, at home in 1942

Personal details
- Born: Margot Irene Duke; 11 January 1919 Tadworth, Surrey, England
- Died: 19 April 2015 (aged 96) Chipping Norton, Oxfordshire, England
- Spouse: Michael Isaacs, 3rd Marquess of Reading (m. 1940; died 1980)
- Children: 4, including The 4th Marquess of Reading

Margot Irene Isaacs, Marchioness of Reading (née Duke; 11 January 1919 – 19 April 2015) was a British aristocrat and campaigner.

== Early life ==
Margot was one of three daughters of Percival Augustus Duke and Violet Mappin, and was the half-sister of Sir Charles Mappin, Violet's son by her first marriage into the Mappin & Webb family.

Margot attended Benenden School and became a society beauty, and the face of Pond's face cream.

== Marriage and family ==
In 1940, Margot married Michael, Viscount Erleigh, later the 3rd Marquess of Reading.

They had four children:

- Simon Isaacs, 4th Marquess of Reading
- Lady Jacqueline Isaacs
- Lord Antony Isaacs, a film producer (Note: From 1983 to 1997, Antony was married to the former Heide Lund, with whom he has two daughters: Tallulah and Ruby. Heide is currently married to Franco Amurri.)
- Lord Alexander Isaacs, a lawyer.

The family lived at Staplefield Grange, Staplefield Green, near Haywards Heath, Sussex.

== Personal interests ==
Margot was one of the first women to hold a pilot's licence, and also competed in the 1952 Round Britain car rally. She wrote an historical novel Anne of the Sealed Knot about her civil war ancestor Anne Duke.

In the 1960s she briefly entertained hopes of standing for the Conservatives in a general election but was persuaded against doing so by her husband.

She took an outspoken position on social issues, writing to the Spectator in support of English football hooligans, and considered a political career as a Conservative. She was a keen member of the Mid Surrey Drag Hunt and later a campaigner for animal rights, particularly camels (through the Wild Camel Protection Foundation) and bears.

== Later life ==
In later life, the Marchioness was deeply devoted to animal welfare. Reportedly, she bombarded anyone she could think of with letters demanding they do more to help bring about greater protection for animals. She was particularly passionate about the plight of moon bears, many of whom endure horrific conditions in China, where they are kept in captivity for the extraction of their bile, an ingredient used in traditional Chinese medicine.

The Marchioness retired to Glebe Farm House, Cornwell, near Chipping Norton in Oxfordshire. She died on 19 April 2015, and her funeral was held at St Mary's Church, Chipping Norton.

== Titles ==
- 1919–1940: Miss Margot Duke
- 1940–1960: Viscountess Erleigh
- 1960–1980: The Most Honorable Marchioness of Reading
- 1980–2015: The Most Honorable Dowager Marchioness of Reading
