= Alice Isaacs, Marchioness of Reading =

The Most Honourable The Marchioness of Reading CI GBE
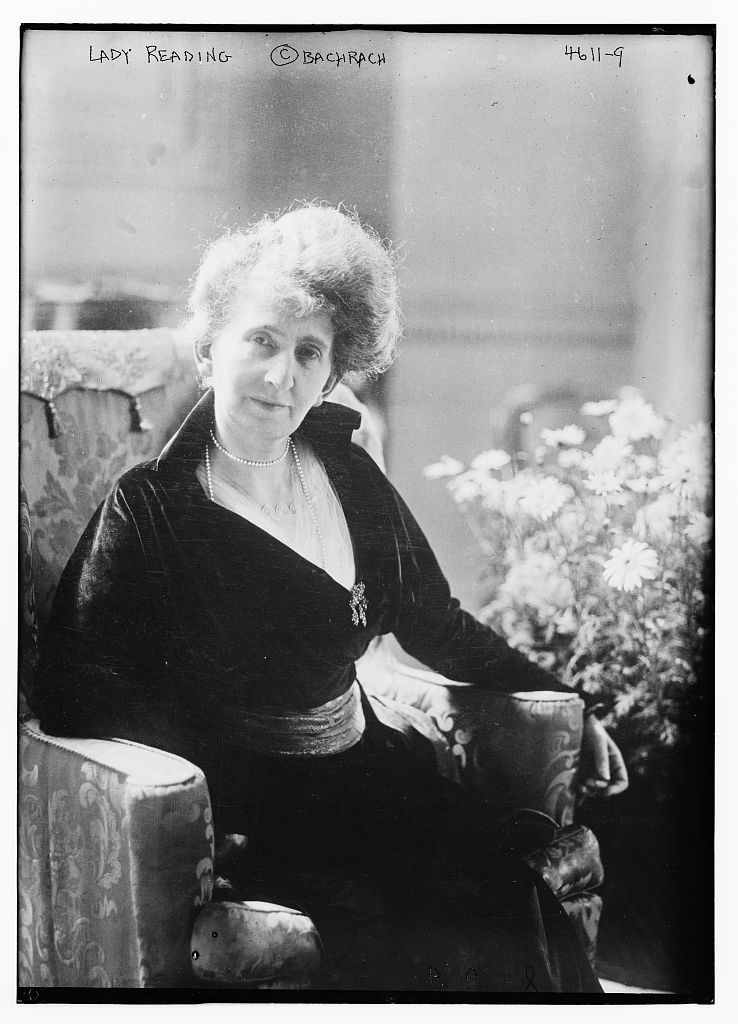
- The Countess of Reading in 1918 by Bachrach Studios

Viceregal-Consort of India
- In role 2 April 1921 – 3 April 1926
- Preceded by: The Lady Chelmsford
- Succeeded by: The Lady Irwin

Personal details
- Born: Alice Edith Cohen; 31 May 1865 Highbury, Middlesex, England
- Died: 30 January 1930 (aged 64)
- Spouse: Rufus Isaacs, 1st Marquess of Reading (m. 1887)
- Children: Gerald Isaacs, 2nd Marquess of Reading

Alice Edith Isaacs, Marchioness of Reading, CI, GBE (née Cohen; 31 May 1865 – 30 January 1930) was the first wife of Rufus Isaacs, 1st Marquess of Reading, and a prominent philanthropist in colonial India. Her husband served as Viceroy and Governor-General of India, making her the Vicereine of India.

Isaacs was born in Highbury, north London, to a Jewish family. She was the third daughter of Albert Cohen, a merchant in the City of London, and his wife, Elizabeth (née Friedmann). She married Rufus Isaacs, then a newly qualified barrister, on 8 December 1887. He had considered being a stockbroker but his wife encouraged him to pursue a career in law. He was ultimately Solicitor-General, Attorney-General and Lord Chief Justice.

Her title successively changed from Mrs Isaacs to Lady Isaacs on her husband's knighthood in 1910, Baroness Reading on his ennoblement in 1914, Viscountess Reading in 1916, the Countess of Reading in 1917, and finally the Marchioness of Reading in 1926.

In 1921, Lord Reading was appointed Viceroy of India. He was reluctant to accept, as his wife's health was delicate, but she persuaded him. She accompanied him to India and, despite continuing poor health, served prominently as Viceregal Consort. She also threw herself into charitable work, particularly with Indian women and children. She established the Women of India Fund in 1921 and National Baby Week in 1923, as well as supporting many existing charities. In 1926 she campaigned to construct a standard hospital in Peshawar, in place of Agerton Hospital. The new hospital was subsequently named as Lady Reading Hospital. Later, upon the retirement of her husband in 1926, they returned to England.

She was appointed Dame Grand Cross of the Order of the British Empire (GBE) in the 1920 civilian war honours and Companion of the Order of the Crown of India (CI) on 14 March 1921, the latter being a traditional honour for the Vicereine of India. She was awarded the Kaiser-i-Hind Medal in gold in the 1924 Birthday Honours. She died of cancer in 1930, aged 64.
