= Global Flying Hospitals =

Humanitarian medical charity based in Macau

Global Flying Hospitals (GFH) is the humanitarian medical charity based in Macau SAR. It is the Logistics Resource to the world's humanitarian medical charities. It was founded in 2001 in the US, by Australian born Neill Newton, to provide medical focus in the Developing World. The charity manufactures and delivers equipment and supplies, such as high-tech, 21st Century mobile medical clinics (dental, surgical, ophthalmology, women's health, prosthetics) into regions requiring services, ferried in specialized aircraft as ILyushin 76 cargo jets.

== Mission ==
- Providing Resources and Logistics to other humanitarian medical charities, to enable them to reach further and wider, and treat more people per mission; per year.
- Supplying of modular transportable field clinics and hospitals
- Supplying new-paradigm emergency shelters for natural disasters and other calamities.
- Supply of medical equipment

== Program features ==
- Manufacturing of specialized mobile clinics and hospitals, made of strong yet lightweight material, with power, water purification, gases and outfitted with state-of-the-art medical equipment, thence ferried in large cargo jet aircraft which have the ability to fly long distance, at speed, and operate into unprepared landing zones.

== Restructuring ==
From 2014 to 2024, GFH was reorganized. Its operation hub remains in Macau SAR as the Head Office, with manufacturing of clinics in Cambodia, as GFH Manufacturing. A new board, new selection of aircraft, new funding model and new vision of providing resources to alliance humanitarian charities ... rather than launching its own missions, became the new focus of this reorganization. The organization is overseen by a board of directors, CFO, CEO, chief engineer and other executives. Newton is the organization's CEO, chairman and founder.

== Head Office ==
In 2009, Global Flying Hospitals (Macau) Association was moved from the US and received approval from the Macau SAR government.

On January 11, 2012, Sofitel Luxury Hotels engaged as an alliance sponsor of Global Flying Hospitals, at a signing ceremony, attended by VIPs, the media and invited guests. With this alliance, the Sofitel Hotels throughout Asia invited guest to donate and support the charity. Dedicated brochures and an in-room television channel further promoted the alliance.

== Planned Forward Hubs ==
The charity is currently working to open three operational bases in Africa, Australia and in Macau to serve South-East Asia, India and East Africa.

== International media coverage ==
- Macau Business magazine devoted a double page to GFH to announce the launch of the Asia Region head office.Macau Business
- The Royal College of Surgeons of Edinburgh's Quincentennial news magazine Surgeon's News featured GFH.
- Canada's Royal College of Physicians and Surgeons featured GFH in its journal, Outlook.
- ENT News, a trade journal covering audiology and ear, nose and throat specialisms, featured GFH at inception in its January 2002 issue in an article.
