= Solly Zuckerman, Baron Zuckerman =

British public servant and zoologist

The Right Honourable The Lord Zuckerman OM KCB FRS
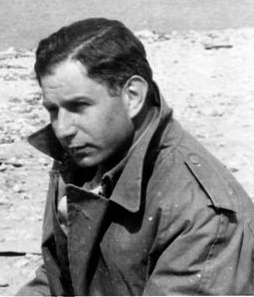
- Zuckerman photographed in Tobruk in 1943 during the Western Desert Campaign
- Born: Solomon Zuckerman; 30 May 1904; Cape Town, Cape Colony (modern-day South Africa)
- Died: 1 April 1993 (aged 88); London, England, United Kingdom
- Citizenship: British
- Education: University of Cape Town; Yale University
- Spouse: Lady Joan Isaacs (m. 1939)
- Children: 2
- Awards: Order of Merit; Knight Commander of the Order of the Bath; Knight Bachelor; Companion of the Order of the Bath; FRS (1943)
- Scientific career
- Fields: Zoology, anatomy, operational research
- Workplaces: University of Oxford; University of Birmingham; University of East Anglia

Solomon "Solly" Zuckerman, Baron Zuckerman OM KCB FRS (30 May 1904 – 1 April 1993) was a British public servant, zoologist and operational research pioneer. He is best remembered as a scientific advisor to the Allies on bombing strategy in the Second World War, for his work to advance the cause of nuclear non-proliferation, and for his role in bringing attention to global economic issues.

== Early life and education ==
Solomon Zuckerman was born in Cape Town in the British Cape Colony (modern-day South Africa) on 30 May 1904, the second child and eldest son of Moses and Rebecca Zuckerman (née Glaser). Both his parents were the children of Jewish immigrants from the Russian Empire.

He was educated at the South African College School. After studying medicine at the University of Cape Town and later attending Yale University, he went to London in 1926 to complete his studies at University College Hospital Medical School.

He began his career at the London Zoological Society in 1928, and worked as a research anatomist until 1932. In this period he founded the intellectual dining club, Tots and Quots. He denied, as early as 1928, that Australopithecus was a genealogical link between apes and humans and maintained this belief throughout his career. In 1932, Zuckerman published his most noteworthy pre-war work, Social Life of Monkeys and Apes. While many of his claims about primate social behavior were later disputed, he is credited with discovering that the female menstrual cycle is a general characteristic of the primate order.

Zuckerman taught at the University of Oxford from 1934 to 1945, during which time he was elected to a Fellowship of the Royal Society.

== Second World War ==
During the Second World War, Zuckerman worked on several research projects for the British government, including the design of a civilian defence helmet (colloquially known as the Zuckerman helmet) and measuring the effect of bombing on people and buildings and an assessment of the bombardment (Operation Corkscrew) of the Italian island of Pantelleria in 1943. He was thus one of the pioneers of the science of operational research. He was given an honorary commission as a wing commander in the Administrative and Special Duties Branch of the Royal Air Force on 13 May 1943, and promoted to honorary group captain on 20 September 1943.

Zuckerman's suggestion, made when he was Scientific Director of the British Bombing Survey Unit (BBSU), and accepted by Air Chief Marshal Arthur Tedder and Supreme Allied Commander U.S. General Dwight D. Eisenhower in the lead-up to the Normandy landings, that the Allies concentrate on disrupting the German-controlled French transportation system through heavy aerial bombing of rail lines and marshalling yards, was officially called the Transportation Plan, but was privately referred to by its opponents as "Zuckerman's Folly". A focus of Zuckerman's plan, learned in Italy, was to target locomotives and the capacity to service them due to a shortage in France prior to the Normandy campaign. This had the effect of pushing railheads back from the front causing trucks to be diverted from a role of manoeuvre to one of logistics, which resulted in greater petrol consumption.

== Later career ==
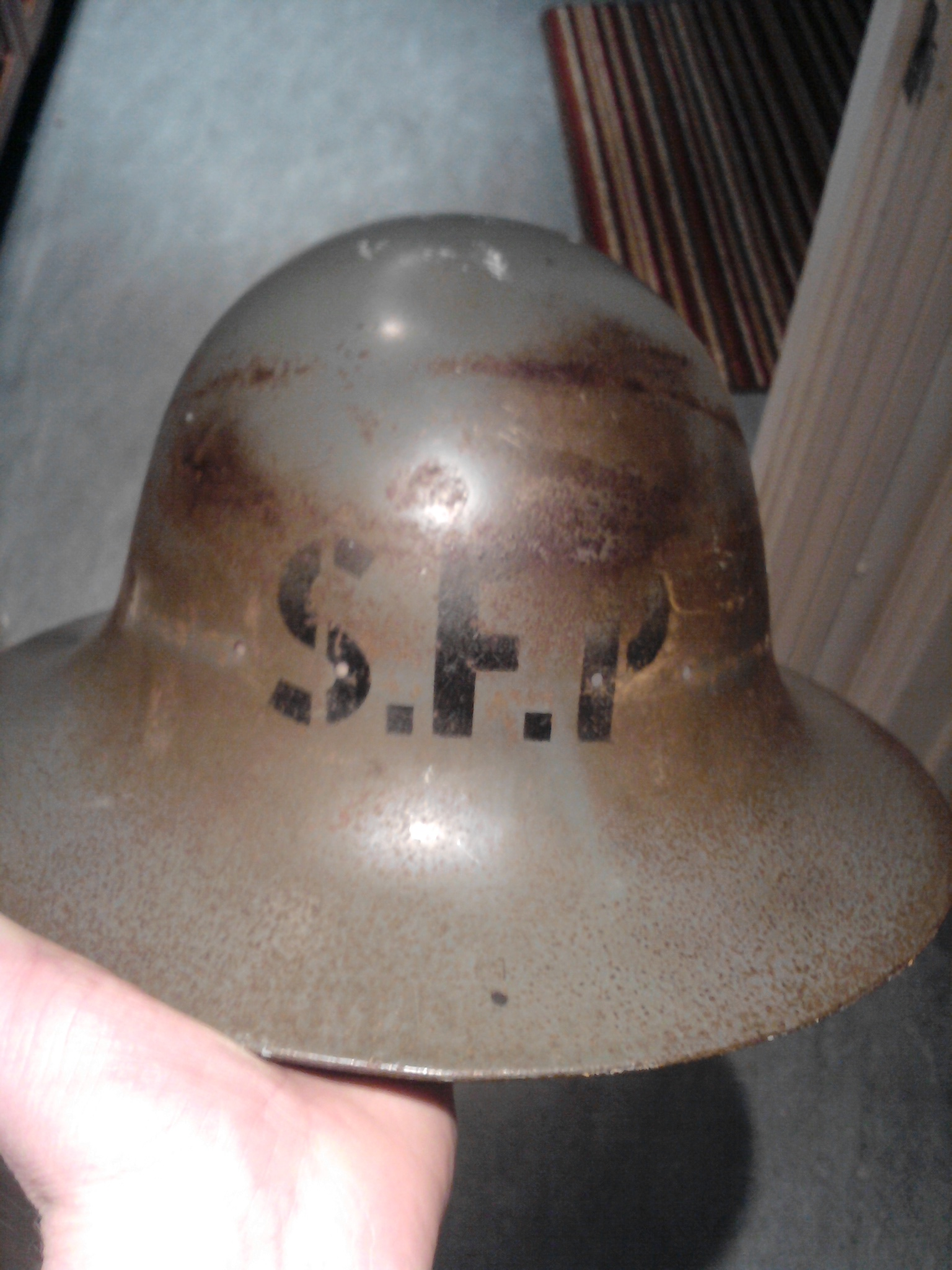
The Zuckerman helmet, designed for civil defence units

After the war, Zuckerman was appointed a Companion of the Order of the Bath in the 1946 New Year Honours. He left the Royal Air Force on 1 September 1946, and was then Professor of Anatomy at the University of Birmingham until 1968, chief scientific adviser to the Ministry of Defence from 1960 to 1966, and the first chief scientific adviser to the British Government from 1964 to 1971. He was also a member of a Royal Commission investigating environmental pollution from 26 February 1970. In 1951 Zuckerman published his paper summarizing the existing data both for and against the possibility of postnatal oogenesis.

He taught at the University of East Anglia from 1969 to 1974, where he was involved in setting up a school of environmental sciences. He served as Secretary of the London Zoological Society from 1955 to 1977 and as its president from 1977 to 1984. Some of Zuckerman's achievements include being a pioneer in the study of primate behaviour. His more notable publications include The Social Life of Monkeys and Apes published in 1931, and Scientists and War in 1966. Zuckerman wrote two volumes of autobiography: From Apes to Warlords and Monkeys, Men and Missiles.

He is also credited for making science a normal part of government policy in the Western world and wrote many articles on this topic, including some formal lectures, collected in Beyond the Ivory Tower. There Zuckerman wrote about the role of science in policy, and how it developed in public (i.e. large funded collaborations) and in private (i.e. behind closed doors in laboratories). He was concerned that the public should understand the contested and serendipitous process of scientific discovery, in contrast to the discovery accounts which were popular, illustrating with hoax and eminent disagreements, at the frontiers of science, because ultimately science ought to serve the public. This led to a concern about the policy for investing in science, or Foresight, which could not, in his view, expect to know what scientific discovery was likely to occur, and therefore how to choose projects for funding. He also advanced the case for engineers and other scientists to adopt an oath, similar to the Hippocratic Oath, to consider the impacts of their work and avoid damaging the world, particularly the natural environment.

== Awards and honours ==
Zuckerman was knighted in the 1956 New Year Honours, promoted Knight Commander of the Order of the Bath in the 1964 New Year Honours, elected to the American Philosophical Society in 1965, appointed to the Order of Merit on 23 April 1968, elected to the American Academy of Arts and Sciences in 1970, and was awarded a life peerage on 5 April 1971, taking the title Baron Zuckerman of Burnham Thorpe in the County of Norfolk. He was elected a Fellow of the Royal Society (FRS) in 1943.

== Family life ==
Zuckerman met his future wife, Lady Joan Isaacs, daughter of Gerald Isaacs, 2nd Marquess of Reading, in Oxford. They married in 1939 and had two children, a son, Paul, and a daughter, Stella. Stella Zuckerman died in 1992, predeceasing her parents. Joan, Lady Zuckerman entertained and did landscapes using pastels. She died in 2000.

Martha Gellhorn described Zuckerman in a letter written to his wife Joan in 1993, shortly after Zuckerman died in London following a heart attack, aged 88:

No doubt he was a strain as a husband, even as a father, but what a wonder he was in himself. The tirelessly inquiring mind, the energy for work, the variety of his thinking. As he grew old, his vanity was touching, as if he didn't really know his own unique value and he had to reassure himself with the names of all the important people he was seeing, when he was far more unusual and far brainier than any of them.

== Arms ==
Coat of arms of Solly Zuckerman, Baron Zuckerman
| Coronet A Coronet of a Baron Crest On a Cap of State Gules turned up Ermine a Lion Sejeant Or supporting a Book bound Azure clasped Or Escutcheon Tierced in pale each per bend bevilled Or and Gules Supporters Dexter: a Great Ape (Gorilla gorilla); Sinister: a Tarsier (Tarsius spectrum), both proper Motto Quot homines tot sententiae (So many men, so many opinions) |

Professional and academic associations
| Preceded by The Viscount Chaplin | Secretary of the Zoological Society of London; 1955–1977 | Succeeded by Ron Hedley |
Government offices
| First | Chief Scientific Adviser to the UK Government; 1964–1971 | Succeeded by Sir Alan Cottrell |
