= Violet Mond, Baroness Melchett =

British humanitarian and philanthropist (1867–1945)

The Right Honourable The Lady Melchett DBE
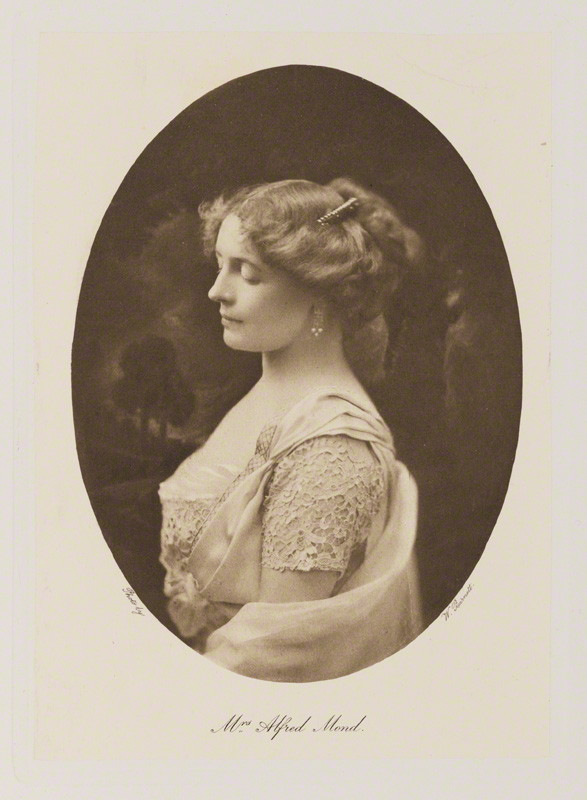
- Violet Florence Mabel Mond, by Henry Walter Barnett, photogravure, 1909
- Born: Violet Florence Mabel Goetze; 27 December 1867
- Died: 25 September 1945 (aged 77)
- Occupations: Humanitarian, activist

Violet Florence Mabel Mond, Baroness Melchett, DBE (née Goetze; 27 December 1867 – 25 September 1945), was a British humanitarian and activist.

Violet Goetze was the daughter of Rosina Hariet (née Bentley; died 1877) and James D. Goetze (died 1911). She was the sister of the painter and sculptor Sigismund Goetze. In 1894 she married the businessman and politician Alfred Mond, who had been introduced to her by her brother. He was created a baronet in 1910 (after which she was styled Lady Mond) and Baron Melchett in 1928. She was an active political hostess and worker, first for the Liberal Party and then, after her husband changed allegiance in 1926, for the Conservative Party. She worked hard to promote her husband's political career and used her influence with David Lloyd George to secure Mond's appointment to ministerial office in December 1916.

The couple had four children: Eva Violet (who married Gerald Isaacs), Henry Ludwig, Mary Angela, and Norah Jean.

As a member of the Women's Work Sub-Committee, Lady Mond was asked to undertake the gathering of information on home hospitals. She appears to have been diligent with regard to this responsibility, and drew up a questionnaire to be circulated.

In the autumn of 1914, Sir Alfred Mond had enthusiastically supported a scheme proposed by Herbert J. Paterson for a hospital for officers. Paterson had already been turned down by the medical authorities of the War Office, as they did not believe in his theory that serious wounds could be cured without the trauma of amputation, given the right environmental conditions and care.

Reportedly, Mond took only two minutes to give the idea his assent and financial backing, and the Queen Alexandra's Hospital for Officers at Highgate was established. The hospital received nine hundred of the worst cases, and "its reputation and record were both noble and happy. Original surgical treatments were evolved and many officers owe the full use of their limbs to ... the care in convalescence at Melchet Court."

Violet Mond had turned her country home, Melchet Court, Wiltshire, into a sixty-bed convalescent hospital, and opened her London home to Belgian refugees. For these services she was appointed Dame Commander of the Order of the British Empire (DBE) in the 1920 Birthday Honours.

She was also heavily involved in infant welfare, chairing the Violet Melchett Centre, a combined infant welfare centre, day nursery and mothers' home in Chelsea, which her husband had financed.
