= Alfred Mond, 1st Baron Melchett =

British industrialist and politician (1868–1930)

The Right Honourable The Lord Melchett PC FRS DL
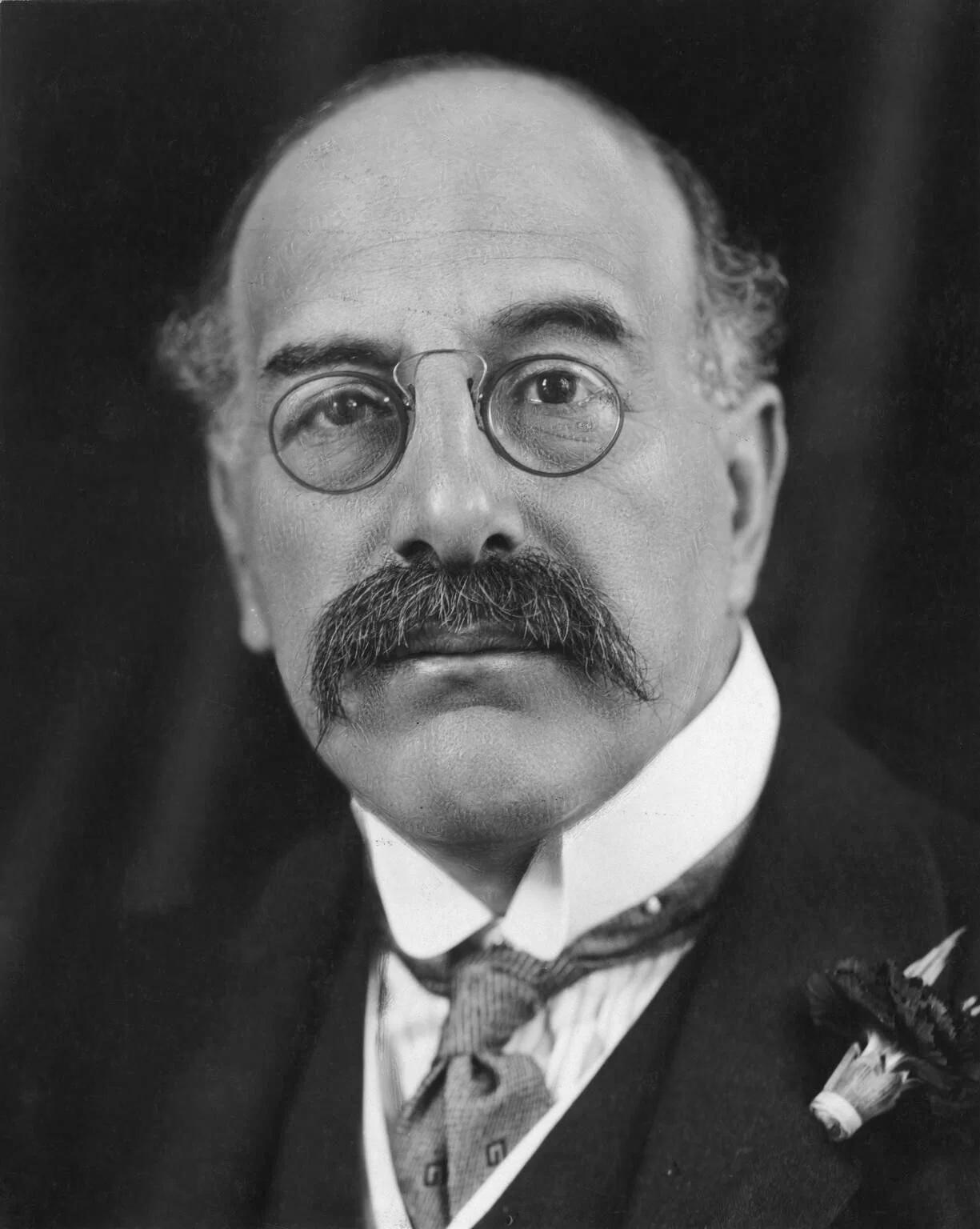

Deputy Leader of the National Liberal Party
- In office 20 November 1922 – 13 November 1923
- Leader: David Lloyd George
- Preceded by: Winston Churchill
- Succeeded by: Party merged with Liberals

Minister of Health
- In office 1 April 1921 – 19 October 1922
- Prime Minister: David Lloyd George
- Preceded by: Christopher Addison
- Succeeded by: Sir Arthur Griffith-Boscawen

First Commissioner of Works
- In office 10 December 1916 – 1 April 1921
- Prime Minister: David Lloyd George
- Preceded by: Lewis Vernon Harcourt
- Succeeded by: The Earl of Crawford

Member of Parliament for Carmarthen
- In office 14 August 1924 – 5 June 1928
- Preceded by: Ellis Ellis-Griffith
- Succeeded by: William Nathaniel Jones

Member of Parliament for Swansea West Swansea (1910–1918)
- In office 15 January 1910 – 6 December 1923
- Preceded by: George Newnes
- Succeeded by: Howel Samuel

Member of Parliament for Chester
- In office 8 February 1906 – 15 January 1910
- Preceded by: Robert Yerburgh
- Succeeded by: Robert Yerburgh

Personal details
- Born: Alfred Moritz Mond; 23 October 1868 Farnworth, Lancashire, England, UK
- Died: 27 December 1930 (aged 62) London, England, UK
- Party: Conservative (1926–1930)
- Other political affiliations: Liberal (Before 1916, 1923–1926); Coalition Liberal (1916–1922); National Liberal (1922–1923)
- Spouse: Violet Goetze (d. 1945)
- Children: 4, including Henry Mond, 2nd Baron Melchett
- Parents: Ludwig Mond (father); Frieda Löwenthal (mother)
- Education: St John's College, Cambridge; University of Edinburgh

Alfred Moritz Mond, 1st Baron Melchett, PC, FRS, DL (23 October 1868 – 27 December 1930), known as Sir Alfred Mond, Bt between 1910 and 1928, was a British industrialist, financier and politician. In his later life he became an active Zionist.

== Early life and education ==
Mond was born in Farnworth, near Prescot, at that time in Lancashire. He was the younger son of Ludwig Mond, a chemist and industrialist who had emigrated from Germany, and his wife Frieda, née Löwenthal, both of Jewish heritage. He was educated at Cheltenham College and St. John's College, Cambridge, but failed his natural sciences tripos. He then studied law at the University of Edinburgh and was called to the bar by the Inner Temple in 1894.

== Business career ==
After his law studies, he joined his father's business Brunner Mond & Company as a director, later becoming its managing director. His other directorships included the Westminster Bank and the Industrial Finance Investment Corporation.

One of his major business achievements came in 1926, when he worked to create the merger of four companies to form Imperial Chemical Industries (ICI), one of the world's largest industrial corporations at the time. He became its first chairman.

Mond was also managing director of his father's other company, the Mond Nickel Company, of which he inherited the majority of shares. He was an active director from the outset, and amongst other growth projects he commissioned the Coniston smelter and the Acton, London nickel carbonyl refinery. He agreed to a proposal of Robert C. Stanley addressing issues at the Frood Mine and recommended the merger of his company into Stanley's International Nickel Company in 1929. Thereafter he sat as a director of the combined company.

== Political career ==
Mond was also involved in politics and sat as Liberal Member of Parliament for Chester from 1906 to 1910, for Swansea from 1910 to 1918 and for Swansea West from 1918 to 1923. He served in the coalition government of David Lloyd George as First Commissioner of Works from 1916 to 1921, and as Minister of Health (with a seat in the cabinet) from 1921 to 1922. After losing his seat at the 1923 general election, he returned to Parliament as a Liberal for Carmarthen at a by-election in August 1924, holding the seat until his elevation to the peerage in 1928. Although a supporter of the "New Liberalism" in his early political career and a "vocal proponent of constructive social reform" in the postwar government, Mond became a Conservative in January 1926 after falling out with Lloyd George over the former Prime Minister's controversial plans to nationalise agricultural land.

Mond was created a Baronet, of Hartford Hill in Great Budworth in the County of Chester, in 1910, and was admitted to the Privy Council in 1913. In the 1928 Birthday Honours he was raised to the peerage as Baron Melchett, of Landford in the County of Southampton.

=== Mondism ===
In the aftermath of the 1926 General Strike, Mond led efforts to establish cooperation between workers (represented by trades unions and the General Council of the TUC) and the large employers; this short-lived initiative became known as Mondism.

== Benefactions, Zionism and honours ==
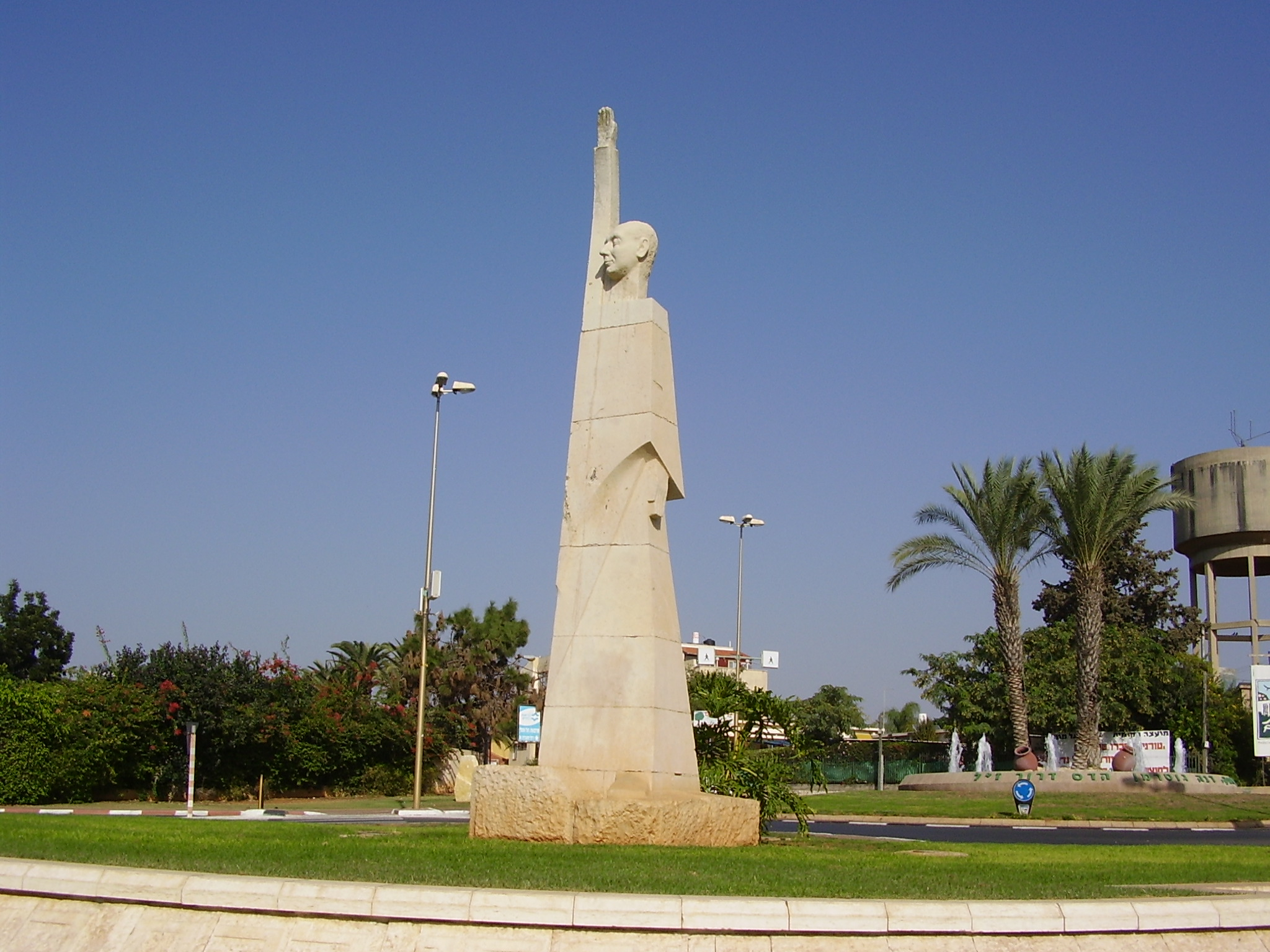
Statue of Lord Melchett, Tel Mond, Israel

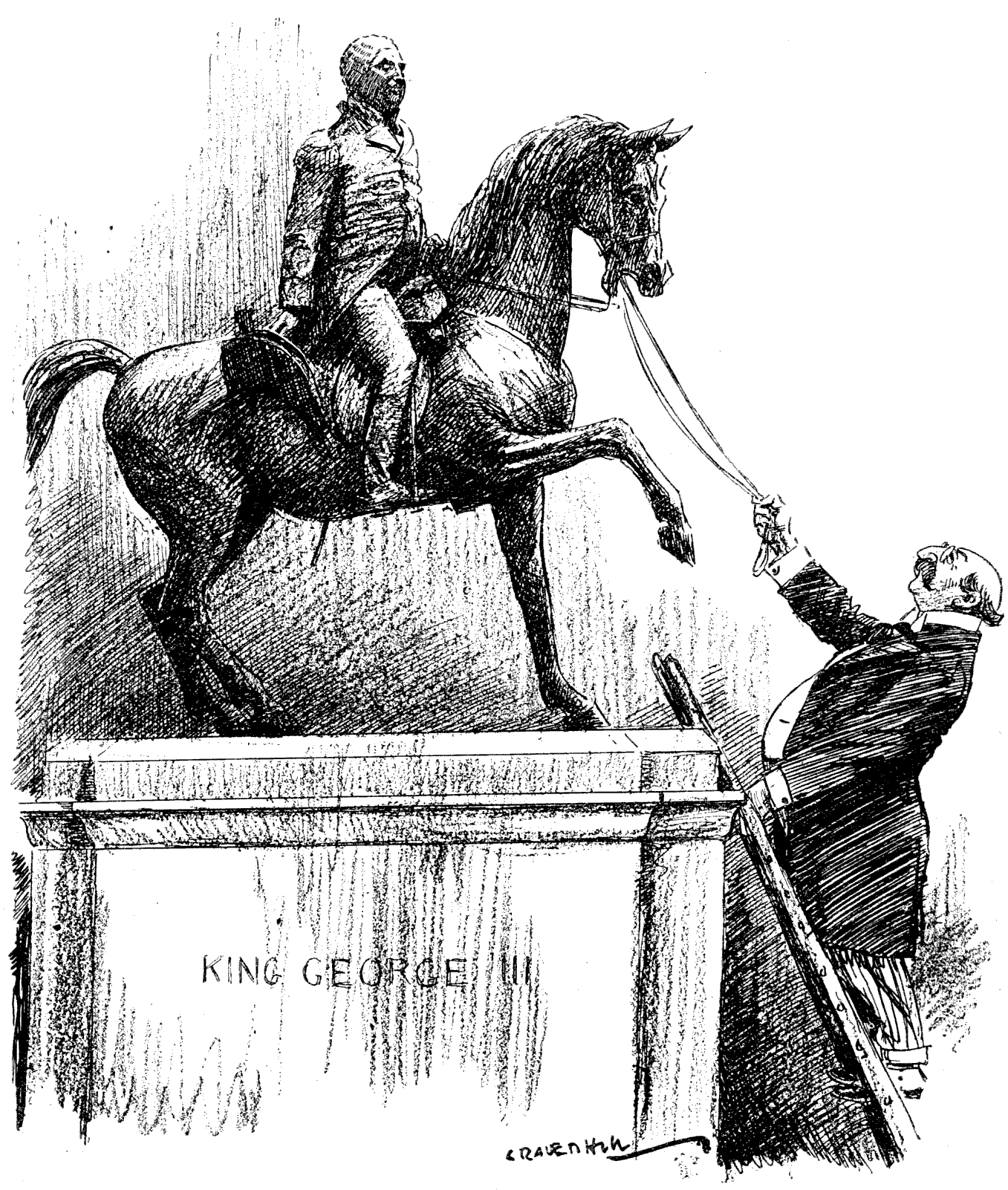
The Iconoclast Sir Alfred Mond: "I'm sorry to have to disturb Your Majesty, but, owing to the shortage of sites—" George III: "Shortage of sights, indeed!" Cartoon from Punch, 18 August 1920

Mond's father had bequeathed a collection of old master paintings to the National Gallery, and Alfred provided housing for them in 1924. In 1929 he provided land in Chelsea for the Chelsea Health Society.

An enthusiastic Zionist, in 1920 Mond donated ten thousand pounds to Vladimir Jabotinsky. The following year he visited Palestine with Chaim Weizmann. He contributed money to the Jewish Colonization Corporation for Palestine and wrote for Zionist publications. He became President of the British Zionist Foundation and made financial contributions to Zionist causes. Melchett founded the town of Tel Mond, now in Israel. He also started building what is now one of the few private houses on the shore of the Sea of Galilee, now known as Villa Melchett. Tel Aviv and several other Israeli cities have a Melchett Street commemorating him.

One of Mond's most enduring contributions to Zionism did not come through direct political means but through his enthusiastic and active support of Pinhas Rutenberg, to whom the British Government granted exclusive concessions to produce and distribute electricity in Palestine. Mond sat on the Board of the Palestine Electric Company and promoted the case of the company in London's political and industrial circles.

Mond was elected a Fellow of the Royal Society in 1928 and received a number of honorary degrees from Oxford, Paris and other universities.

== Personal life ==
In 1894 Mond married Violet Goetze and they had one son, Henry Ludwig, and three daughters, Eva Violet, Mary Angela, and Norah Jena. Mond died in his London home in 1930, and his son succeeded in the barony.

== Publications ==
- Industry and Politics (1927)
- Imperial Economic Unity (1930)

== Literary references ==
Mond is mentioned in T. S. Eliot's 1920 poem A Cooking Egg. He is also – along with the Turkish leader Mustafa Kemal Atatürk – widely considered to be the inspiration behind Mustapha Mond, one of the ten world controllers in Aldous Huxley's 1932 novel Brave New World.

== Coat of arms ==
Coat of arms of Alfred Mond, 1st Baron Melchett
Notes Coat of arms of the Mond family Coronet A coronet of a Baron Crest A Demi-Bear holding between the paws a Fountain both proper. Escutcheon Quarterly: 1st and 4th, Gules a Demi-Lion rampant argent between in chief a Decrescent and an Increscent and in base a Crescent all Or on a Chief Argent an Eagle displayed between two Mullets Sable (Mond); 2nd and 3rd, Azure on a Pile between three Mullets Argent an Eagle displayed Sable (Lowenthal). Supporters Dexter: a Doctor of Science of the University of Oxford holding in the exterior hand a Chemical Measure Glass; Sinister: a Labourer holding in the exterior hand a Pick resting on the shoulder, all proper. Motto Make Yourself Necessary

== See also ==
- Ludwig Mond Award
- Melchett Medal
- Mond gas

Parliament of the United Kingdom
Preceded by Robert Yerburgh	Member of Parliament for Chester; 1906–1910	Succeeded by Robert Yerburgh
Preceded by Sir George Newnes, Bt	Member of Parliament for Swansea; 1910–1918	Constituency abolished
New constituency	Member of Parliament for Swansea West; 1918–1923	Succeeded by Howel Walter Samuel
Preceded by Sir Ellis Ellis-Griffith, Bt	Member of Parliament for Carmarthen; 1924–1928	Succeeded by William Nathaniel Jones
Political offices
Preceded by Lewis Vernon Harcourt	First Commissioner of Works; 1916–1921	Succeeded by The Earl of Crawford
Preceded by Christopher Addison	Minister of Health; 1921–1922	Succeeded by Sir Arthur Griffith-Boscawen
Party political offices
Preceded by Winston Churchill	Deputy Leader of the National Liberal Party; 1922–1923	Party merged with the Liberals
Peerage of the United Kingdom
New creation	Baron Melchett; 1928–1930	Succeeded by Henry Mond
Baronetage of the United Kingdom
New creation	Baronet (of Hartford Hill); 1910–1930	Succeeded by Henry Mond
