= Ghent University =

Public university in Belgium

Coordinates: 51.046582°N 3.727918°E

- Universiteit Gent
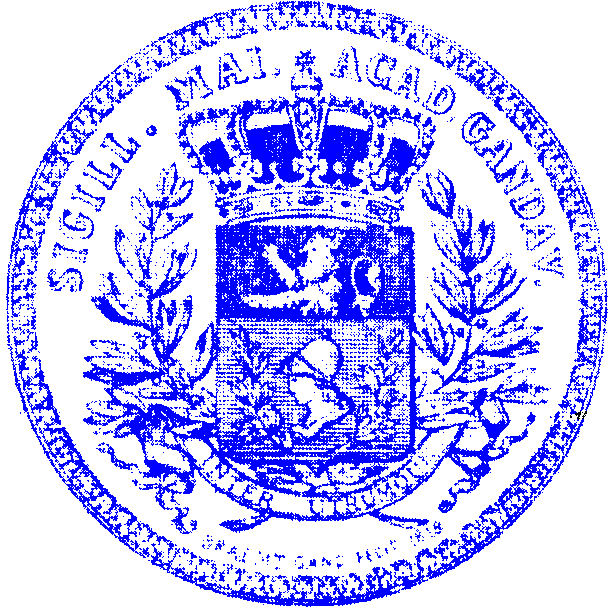
- Seal of Ghent University
- Latin: Universitas Gandavensis
- Former name: State University of Ghent
- Motto: Sapere Aude (Latin)
- Motto in English: Dare to Think/Durf Denken
- Type: Public
- Established: 1817; 209 years ago
- Affiliations: CESAER; EUA; The Guild; SGroup; ENLIGHT; 3I University Network; 3C Partnership
- Rector: Petra De Sutter
- Administrative staff: 9,000
- Students: +50,000
- Location: (Belgium) Ghent, Belgium
- Campus: University town
- Colours: UGent blue & white
- Website: www.ugent.be

Ghent University (Dutch: Universiteit Gent, abbreviated as UGent) is a public research university located in Ghent, in the East Flanders province of Belgium.

Located in Flanders, Ghent University is the second largest Belgian university, consisting of 50,000 students and 9,000 staff members. The university also supports the Ghent University Library (including the famous Boekentoren) and the Ghent University Hospital, which is one of the biggest hospitals in Belgium. In addition to satellite campuses elsewhere in Flanders and a Global Campus in Songdo, South Korea, Ghent University maintains many inter-university partnerships and programs both inside and outside of Europe.

Established before the state of Belgium itself, the university was founded by the Dutch King William I in 1817, when the region was incorporated into the United Kingdom of the Netherlands after the fall of First French Empire. In that same year, he founded two other universities for the southern provinces as well, alongside Ghent University: University of Liège and State University of Leuven.

After the Belgian revolution of 1830, the newly formed Belgian state began to administer Ghent University. In 1930, UGent became the first Dutch-speaking university in Belgium. Previously, French (and, even earlier, Latin) had been the standard academic language in what was Université de Gand. In 1991, it was granted major autonomy and changed its name accordingly from State University of Ghent (Dutch: Rijksuniversiteit Gent, abbreviated as RUG) to its current designation.

== History ==
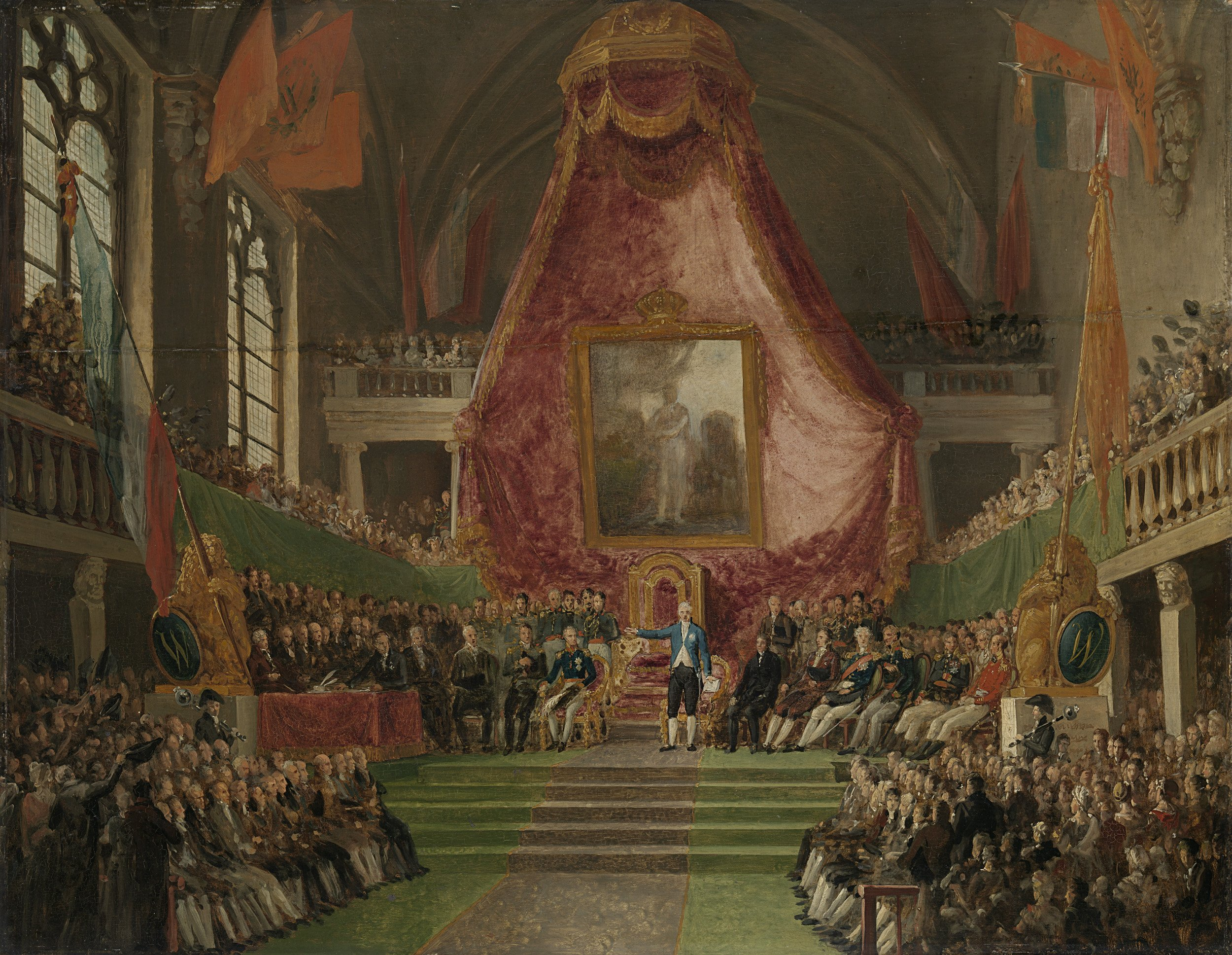
Painting of the establishment of the State University of Ghent in 1817 when the city was under Dutch rule

=== Foundation in the 19th century ===
Ghent was one of the largest and most important cities of Europe in the medieval period.

The university in Ghent was opened on 9 October 1817, with JC van Rotterdam as the first rector. The foundation of universities in Ghent, Liege, and Leuven that year – by the Dutch King William I – was part of a larger policy to stimulate academic lag across the southern provinces of the United Kingdom of the Netherlands (which would later become Belgium). The original four faculties comprised Humanities (Letters), Law, Medicine, and Science, with the language of instruction being Latin. In the first year, it had 190 students and 16 professors.

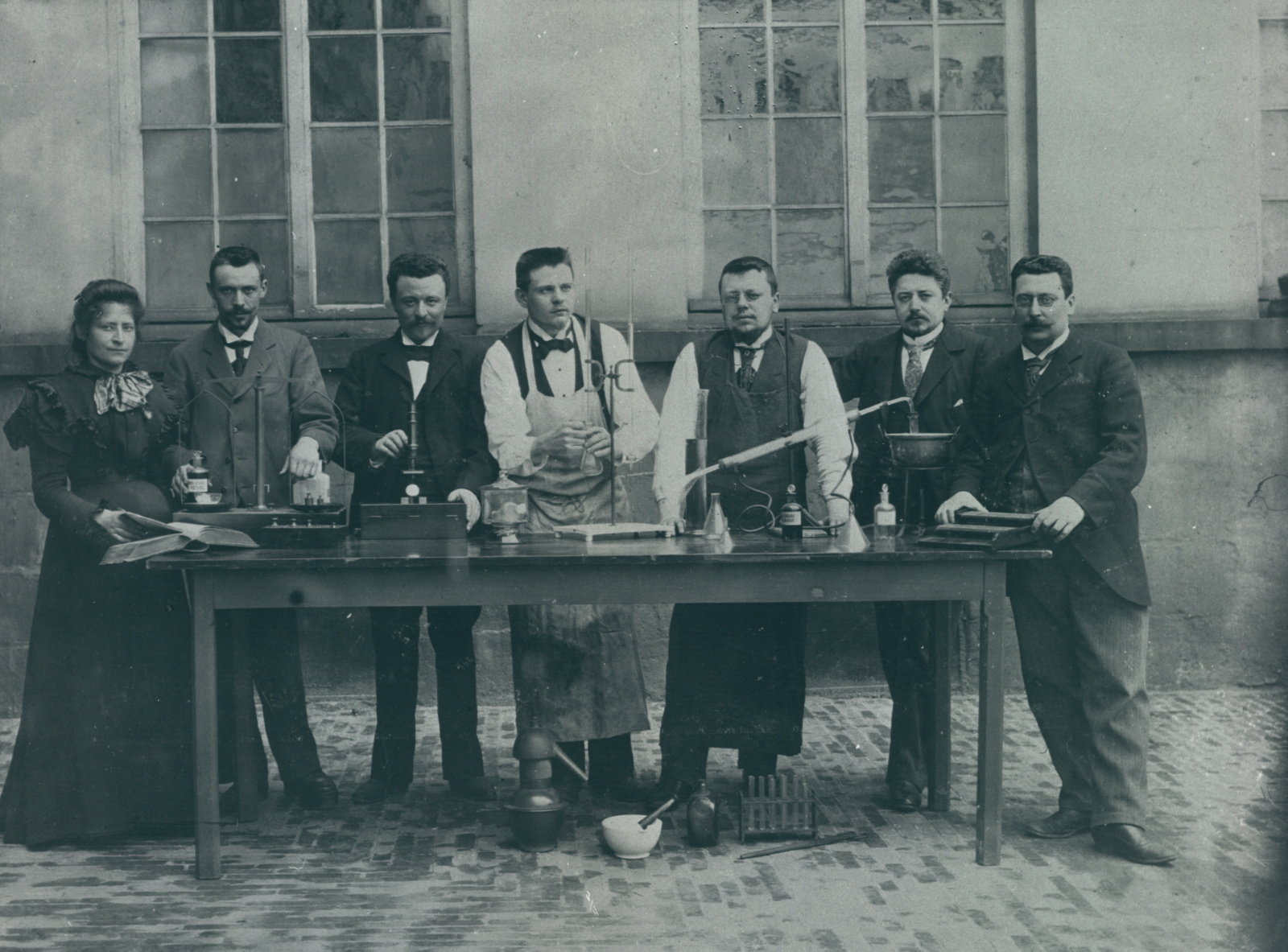
Pharmacy students during practicum (1890)

In the wake of the Belgian Revolution, of 1830, the number of students declined, having peaked at 414. Although the faculties of humanities and science were dissolved from the university, they were restored five years later, in 1835. At this time, French also became the language of instruction, taking the place of Latin.

Ghent University played a role in the foundation of modern organic chemistry. Friedrich August Kekulé unraveled the structure of benzene at Ghent and Adolf von Baeyer (Johann Friedrich Wilhelm Adolf von Baeyer), a student of August Kekulé, made contributions to organic chemistry.

In 1882, Sidonie Verhelst became the first female student at Ghent University, in science and pharmacology.

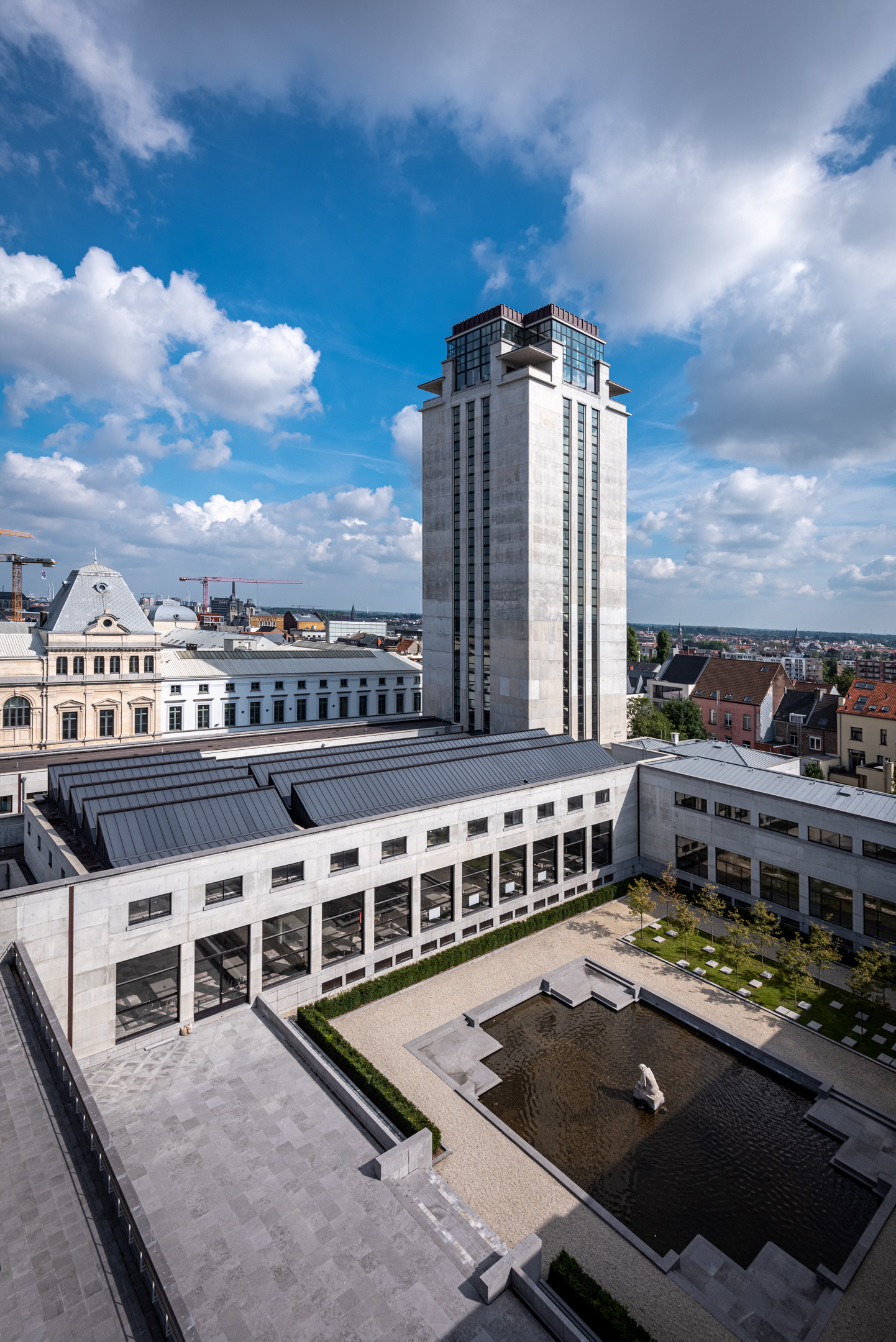
2021 Boekentoren - Ghent University Library

=== Developments in the 20th century ===
In 1903, the Flemish politician Lodewijk De Raet led a successful campaign to begin instruction in Dutch, and the first courses were begun in 1906.

During World War I, Ghent University was initially closed due to hostilities and subsequently due to the refusal of the academic staff and the students to resume classes while Belgium was occupied. Moritz von Bissing, the German Governor-General of occupied Belgium sought to make the territory easier to govern by exploiting the pre-war linguistic division. The Flamenpolitik ("Policy regarding the Flemish people") was launched in 1916. The occupying German administration set up the first Dutch-speaking university in Belgium in Ghent under the name Vlaamsche Hoogeschool (Flemish Institute of Higher Learning). Pejoratively referred to as the Von Bissing University, the Vlaamsche Hoogeschool was founded in 1916 but was disestablished after the war and the University of Ghent resumed its activities with French as the sole medium of instruction. In 1923, Cabinet Minister Pierre Nolf put forward a motion to definitively establish the university as a Dutch-speaking university, and this was realized in 1930. August Vermeylen served as the first rector of a Dutch-language university in Belgium.

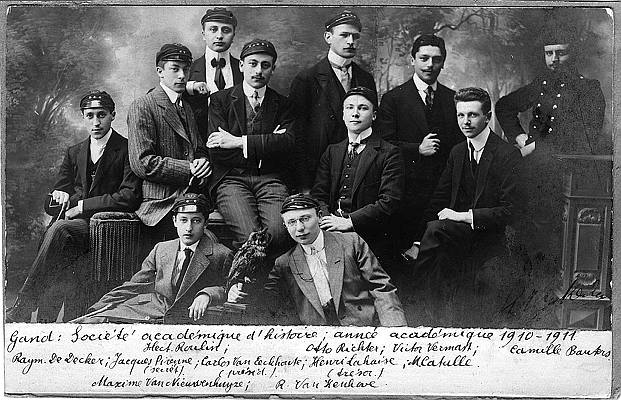
Student Association "Société Académique d'Histoire" (1910)

In the Second World War, the German administration of the university attempted to create a German orientation, removing faculty members and installing loyal activists.

In the postwar period, Ghent University became a much larger institution, following the government policy of democratizing higher education in Flanders during the 1950s and 1960s. By 1953, there were more than 3,000 students, and by 1969 more than 11,500.

The number of faculties increased to eleven, starting with Applied Sciences in 1957. It was followed by Economics and Veterinary Medicine in 1968, Psychology and Pedagogy, as well as Bioengineering, in 1969, and Pharmaceutical Sciences.

In the 1960s, there were several student demonstrations at Ghent University, notably around the Blandijn site, which houses the Faculty of Arts & Philosophy. The most severe of demonstrations took place in 1969 in the wake of May 1968.

=== Since the end of the Cold War ===
In 1991, the university officially changed its name from Rijksuniversiteit Gent (RUG) to Universiteit Gent (UGent), following an increased grant of autonomy by the government of the Flemish Community. The faculty of Politics and Social Sciences is the most recent addition, in 1992.

Ghent University had a program founded by Andre Vlerick in 1953, then called Centre for Productivity Studies and Research. The program later evolved into a separate school called Instituut Professor Vlerick voor Management. Later in 1999 together with KU Leuven, Ghent University established Vlerick Business School merging the two MBA programs of the universities, naming the newborn institute Vlerick Leuven Gent Management School. In 2006, the school rebranded itself as Vlerick Business School. KU Leuven and Ghent University are still the parent institutions of the business school where many of the school's professors teach also in Leuven or Ghent. Nevertheless, UGent still offer MBA programs even after the merger.

Ghent University has been instrumental in the development of COinS and Unipept.

== Academic profile ==
=== Organisation and structure ===
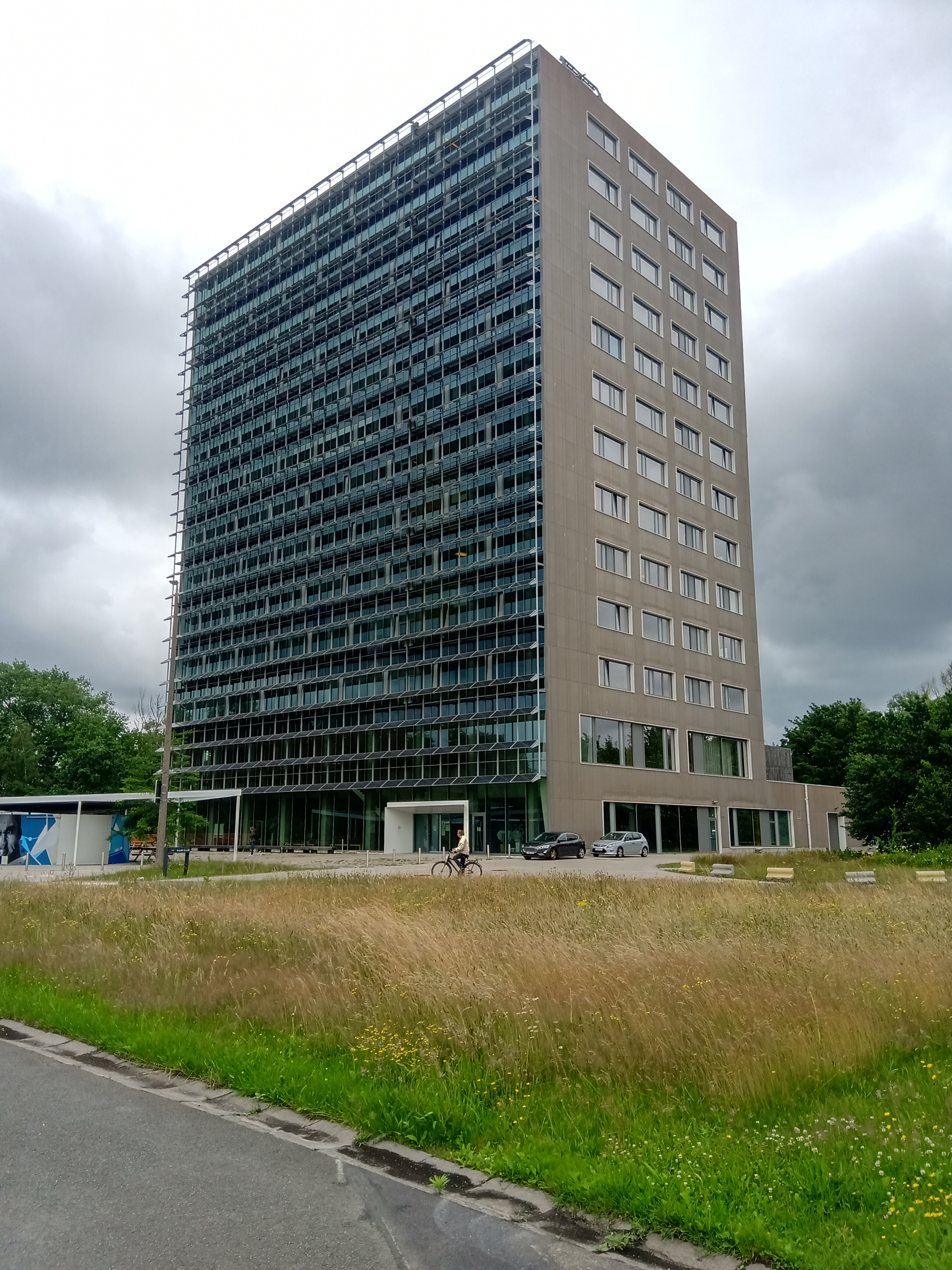
iGent tower in Zwijnaarde Science Park

Ghent University consists of eleven faculties with over 130 individual departments. In addition, the university maintains the Zwijnaarde science park and Greenbridge science park.

=== Library ===
Standing on the Blandijnberg, the Boekentoren houses the Ghent University Library, which contains nearly 3 million volumes. The university library has joined the Google Books Library Project. Among other notable collections, it preserves Papyrus 30, an early manuscript of the Greek New Testament.

The university is also a partner in the development of De Krook, the new public library and media center in the center of Ghent that opened in 2017.

=== Reputation & rankings ===
University rankings

Global – Overall
- ARWU World: 84 (2023)
- CWUR World: 118 (2020–21)
- CWTS World: 75 (2020)
- QS World: 162 (2026)
- Reuters World: 98 (2019)
- THE World: 115 (2024)
- USNWR Global: =95 (2023)

National – Overall
- ARWU National: 1 (2023)
- CWTS National: 2 (2020)
- CWUR National: 2 (2020–21)
- QS National: 2 (2024)
- THE National: 2 (2024)
- USNWR National: 2 (2023)

Ghent University consistently ranks among the top 100 universities in the world, alongside the Catholic University of Leuven. In the Academic Ranking of World Universities, it is the top-ranked Belgian university. In the Global University Ranking and the Ranking of World Universities, Ghent University ranks second.

In 2017, it was ranked, globally, 69th by the Academic Ranking of World Universities (or Shanghai ranking) and 125th by QS World University Rankings. For 2021, Ghent University has been ranked, worldwide, 85th by U.S. News & World Report and 96th by Times Higher Education.

Academic Ranking ofWorld Universities
Jaar	Rang
2003	99
2004	101-152
2005	101-152
2006	101-152
2007	101-152
2008	101-152
2009	101-152
2010	90
2011	89
2012	89
2013	85
2014	70
2015	71
2016	62
2017	69
2018	61
2019	66
2020	66
2021	71
2022	74
2023	84
2024	90

Times HigherEducation World University Ranking
Jaar	Rang
2011	124
2012	106
2013	93
2014	85
2015	90
2016	118
2017	118
2018	107
2019	143
2020	123
2021	103
2022	96
2023	107
2024	115
2025	112

=== International networks ===
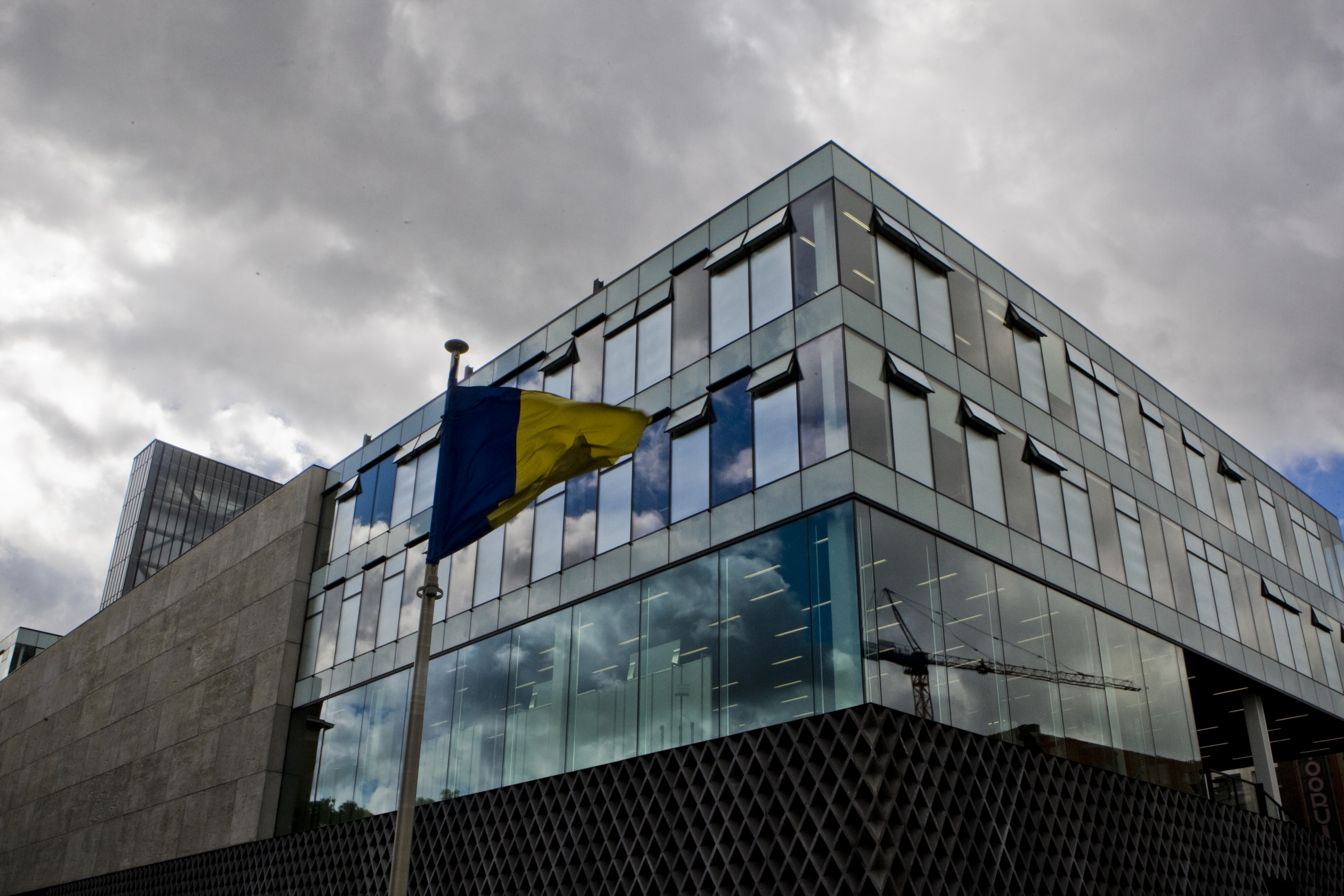
Ufo campus - university forum

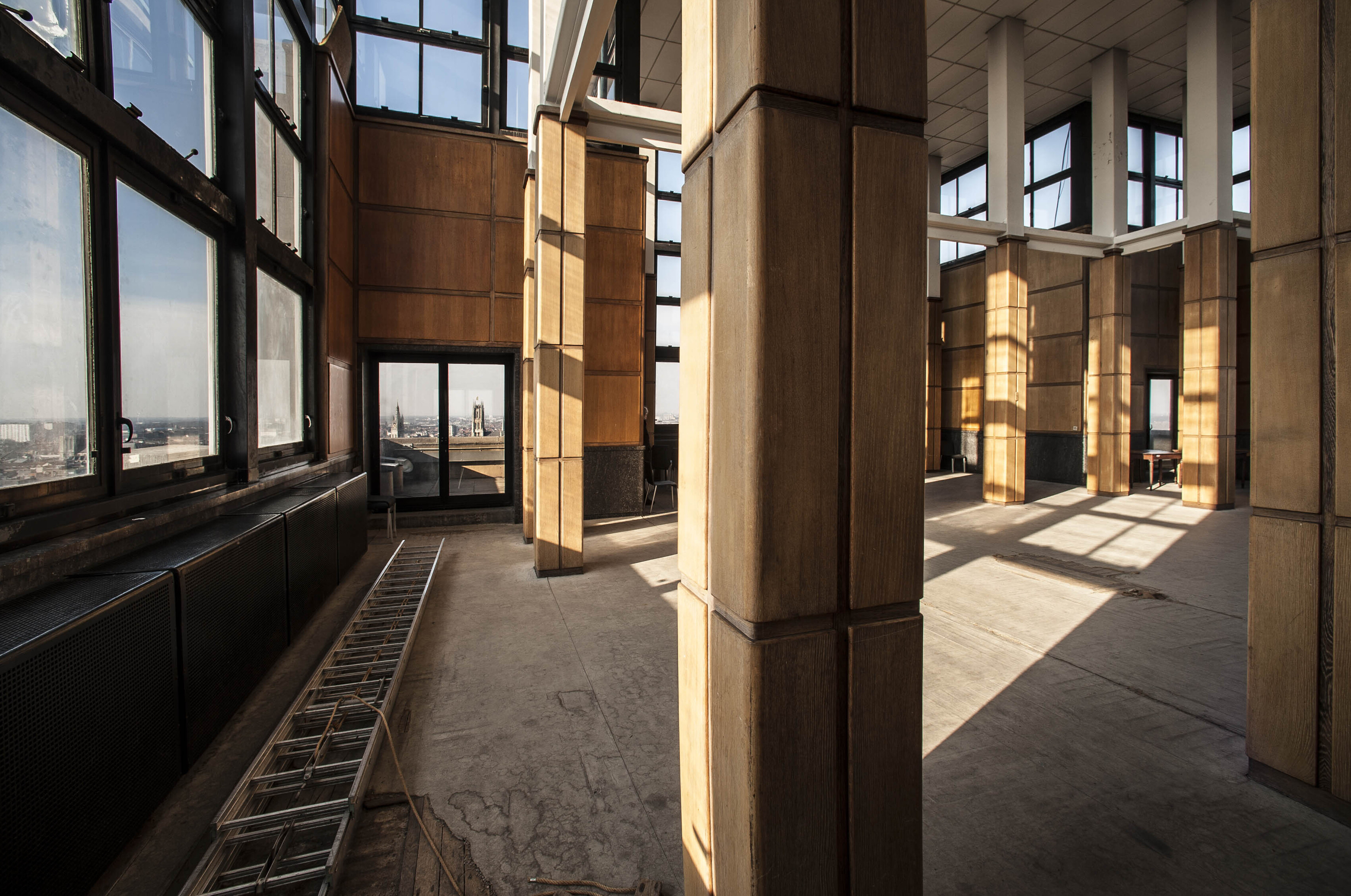
UGent Boekentoren

The university maintains many partnerships within Belgium, across Europe, and throughout the world.

Inside Belgium, Ghent University supports the Belgian Co-ordinated Collections of Micro-organisms and the Vlaams Instituut voor Biotechnologie.

Within Europe, it is a member of the Santander Network, the Enlight (previously the U4) Network, and the 3i University Network. It also participates in the Conference of European Schools for Advanced Engineering Education and Research. In addition, the university cooperates with numerous universities for the Erasmus and Erasmus Mundus programs; within the framework of the latter, it heads the International Master of Science in Rural Development and the International Master of Science in Soils and Global Change (IMSOGLO).

Beyond Europe, Ghent University conducts exchange programs on all continents except Antarctica. Frameworks include its campus in South Korea and its 3C Partnership.

== Controversies ==
=== Gaza war ===
In 2024, a group of students organized an occupation of a university building, committed acts of vandalism, and justified their action by claiming that their activism is framed as a climate change issue: "free Palestine is a climate justice issue".

The university subsequently severed ties with Israeli universities on the ground of alleged international law issues. The allegations were described as "superficial and hasty, sloppy work" by critics, who suggested that the university has ideological issues and a lack of interest in academic freedom.

Long after the Gaza ceasefire, the new rector, former left-wing politician Petra De Sutter, expressed her willingness to position the university along a line of criticism of Israel, but deplores the adverse consequences of politicisation on partnerships and fundings. In consequences, the university decided to take political siding by offering an Honorary Doctorate to Francesca Albanese for her activism against Israel, which was criticized as "institutional activism" by some professors. A situation of association with antisemitism according to some politicians, to Jewish organizations and to the Combat Antisemitism Movement. In reaction, Israel's Diaspora Affairs and Combating Antisemitism Minister Amichai Chikli urged Jewish students to leave the university as he claim that antisemitism is being "normalized" and "actively encouraged".

In 2026, masking their faces, Palestinian nationalist protesters confronted the Belgian police, causing slight injuries to two police officers, while justifying vandalism as a legitimate intimidation. Rector Petra De Sutter declared: "The safety of students and staff is paramount. We want to be caring towards all Ghent University staff, but firm regarding wrongdoing".

=== Abuse of power ===
In 2022, the VRT, the Flemish broadcaster, released an exposé on systemic abusive of power in Flemish universities, which featured cases from Ghent University. This included a lack of meaningful disciplinary action against professors.

In 2025, the VRT released another exposé, this time on transgressive behaviour in Flemish universities, ranging from sexual harassment to financial fraud. It reported that, in the previous 10 years, only 3 out of 45 disciplinary procedures for toxic behaviour resulted in removal of professors. One of those three included a Ghent professor, who – after years of controversy – was removed only the week before the documentary aired.

=== Scientific racism ===
In 2026, postdoctoral researcher and scientific racism advocate Nathan Cofnas was suspended as part of a preliminary disciplinary investigation following the death of University of Cambridge sociologist Jason Arday. On August 28, 2026, after being in contact with US ambassador to Belgium Bill White regarding the Cofnas case, Ghent University said that Cofnas could resume academic work on the condition that he work remotely and not teach while investigations were pending.

== People ==
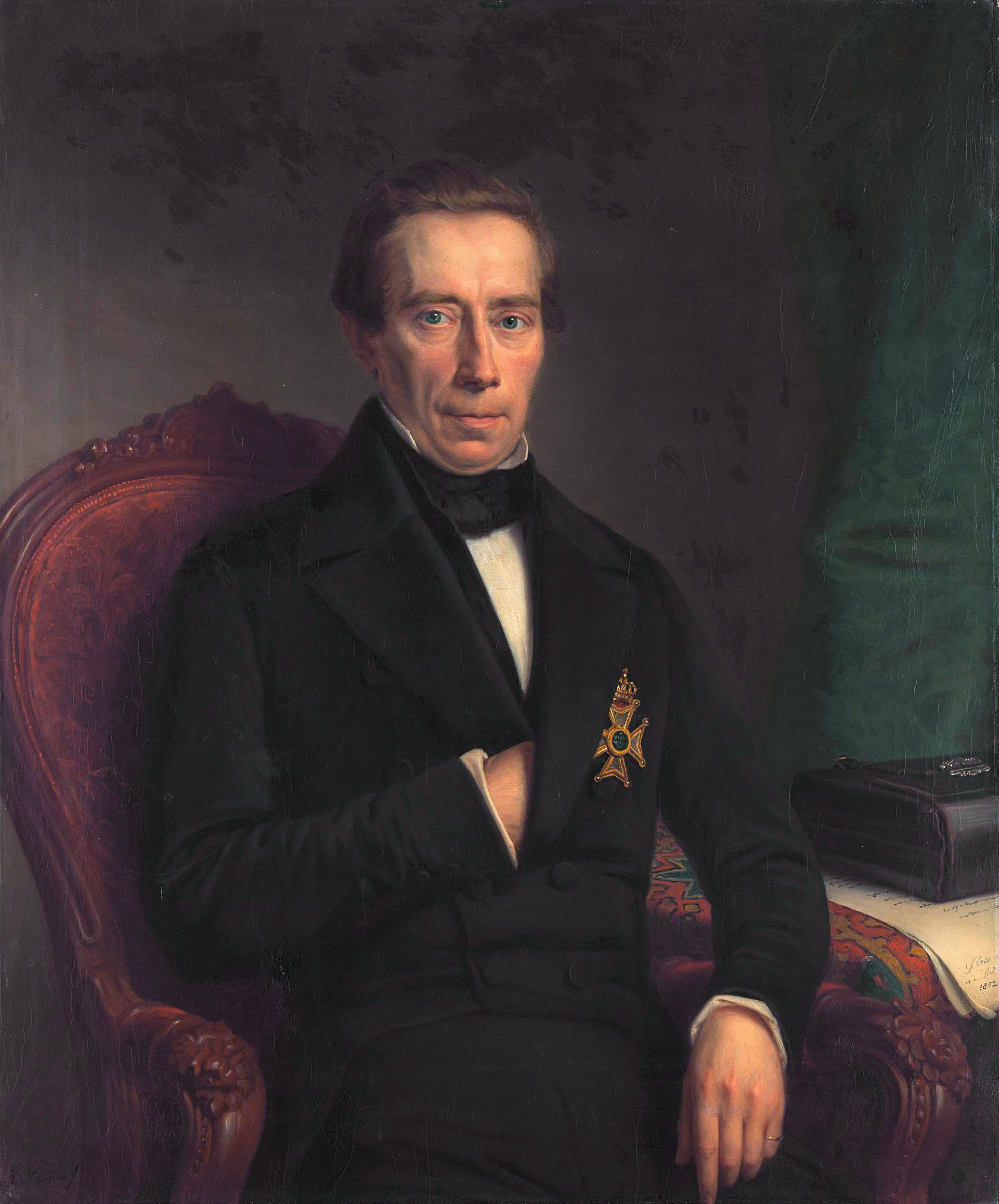
Johan Rudolf Thorbecke, statesman

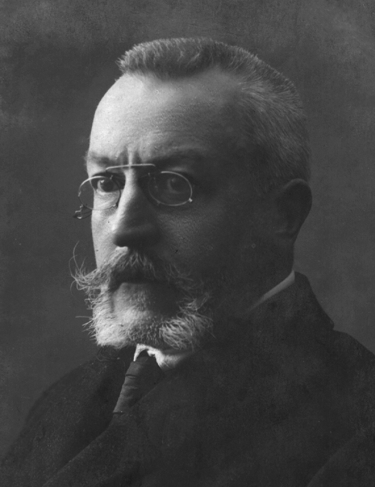
Henri Pirenne, historian

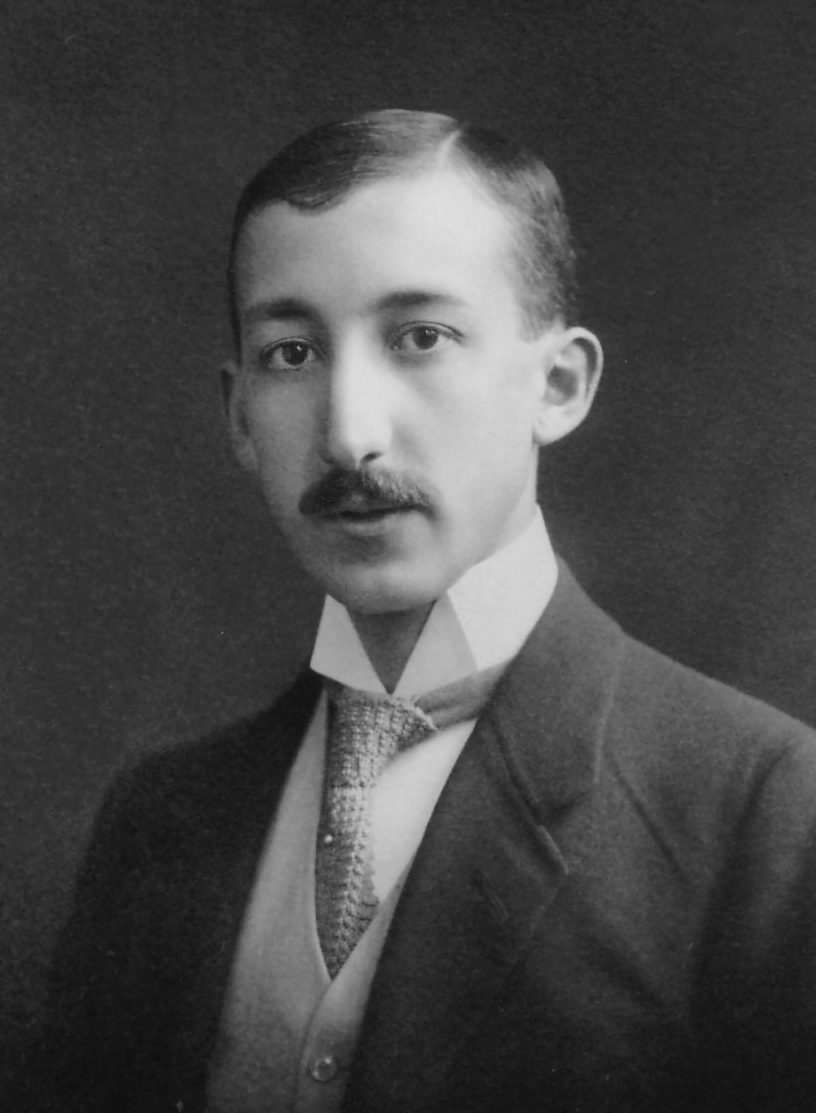
George de Hevesy, Nobel Prize winner in Chemistry

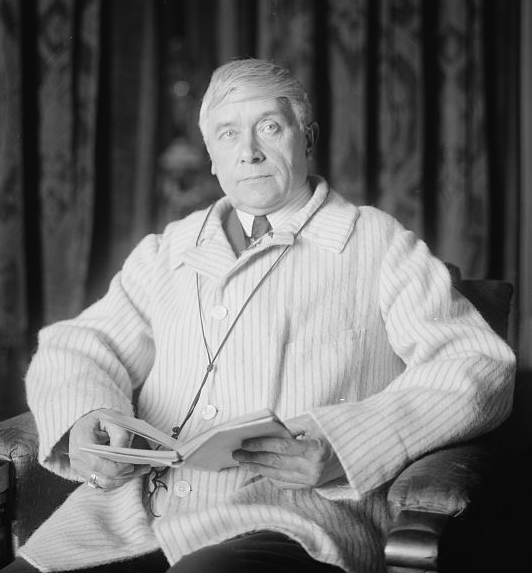
Maurice Maeterlinck, Nobel Prize winner in Literature

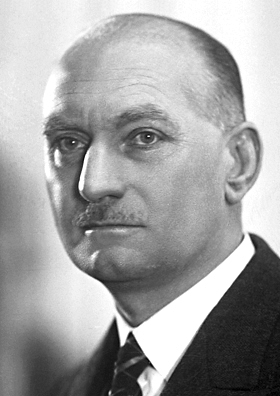
Corneel Heymans, Nobel Prize winner in Medicine

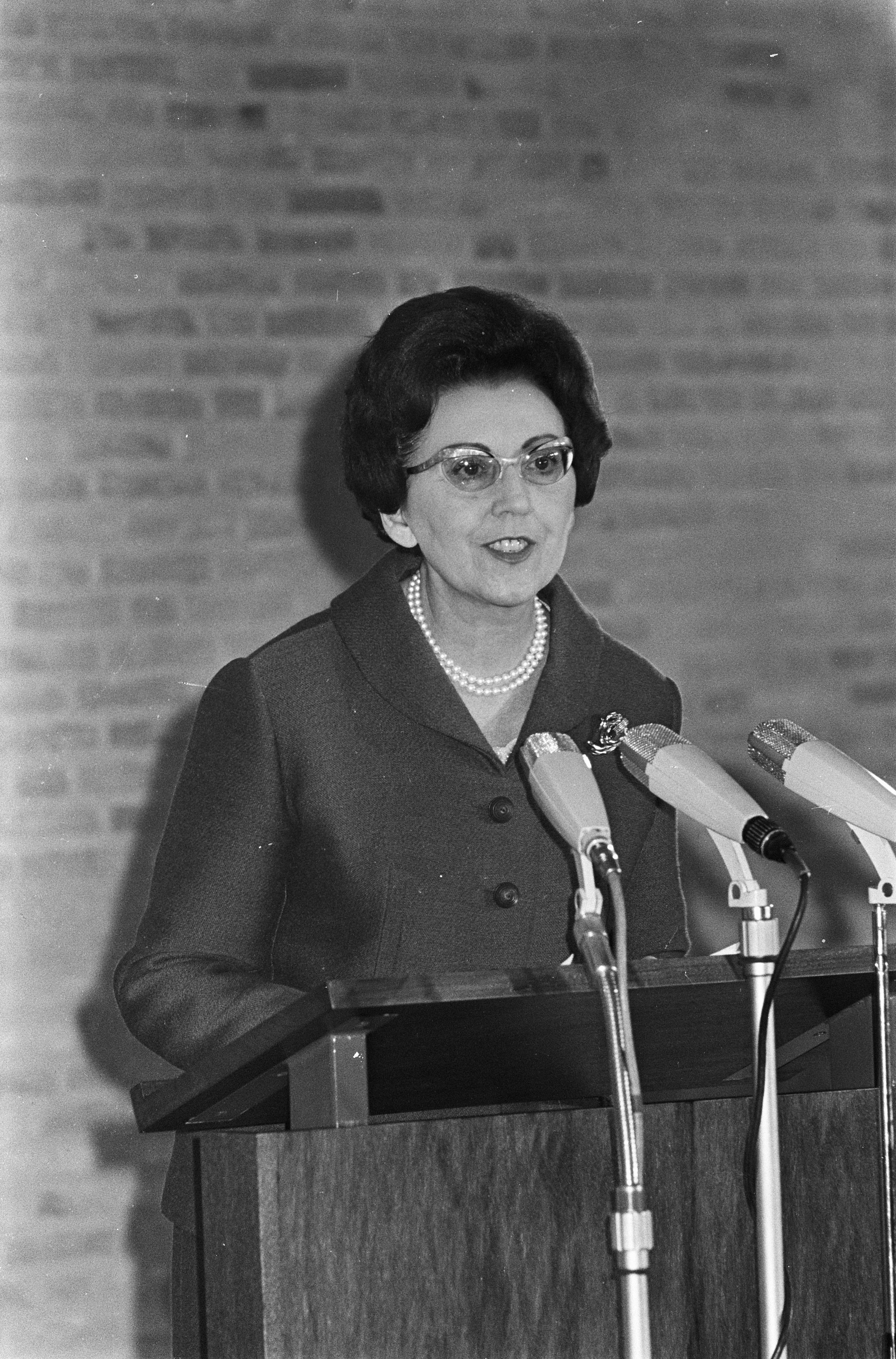
Marguerite Legot, first female government minister in Belgium

Yaakov Dori, president of the Technion, Haifa

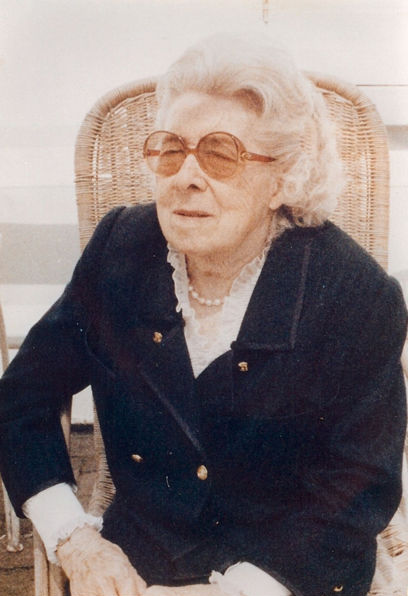
Suzanne Lilar, feminist writer

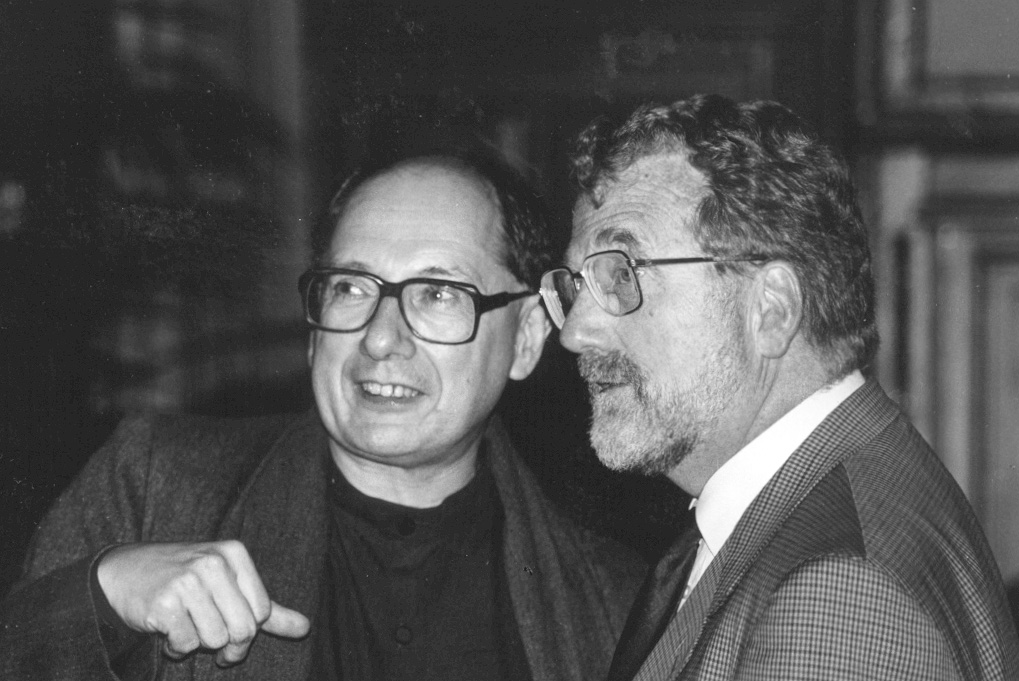
Jozef Schell (right), molecular biologist

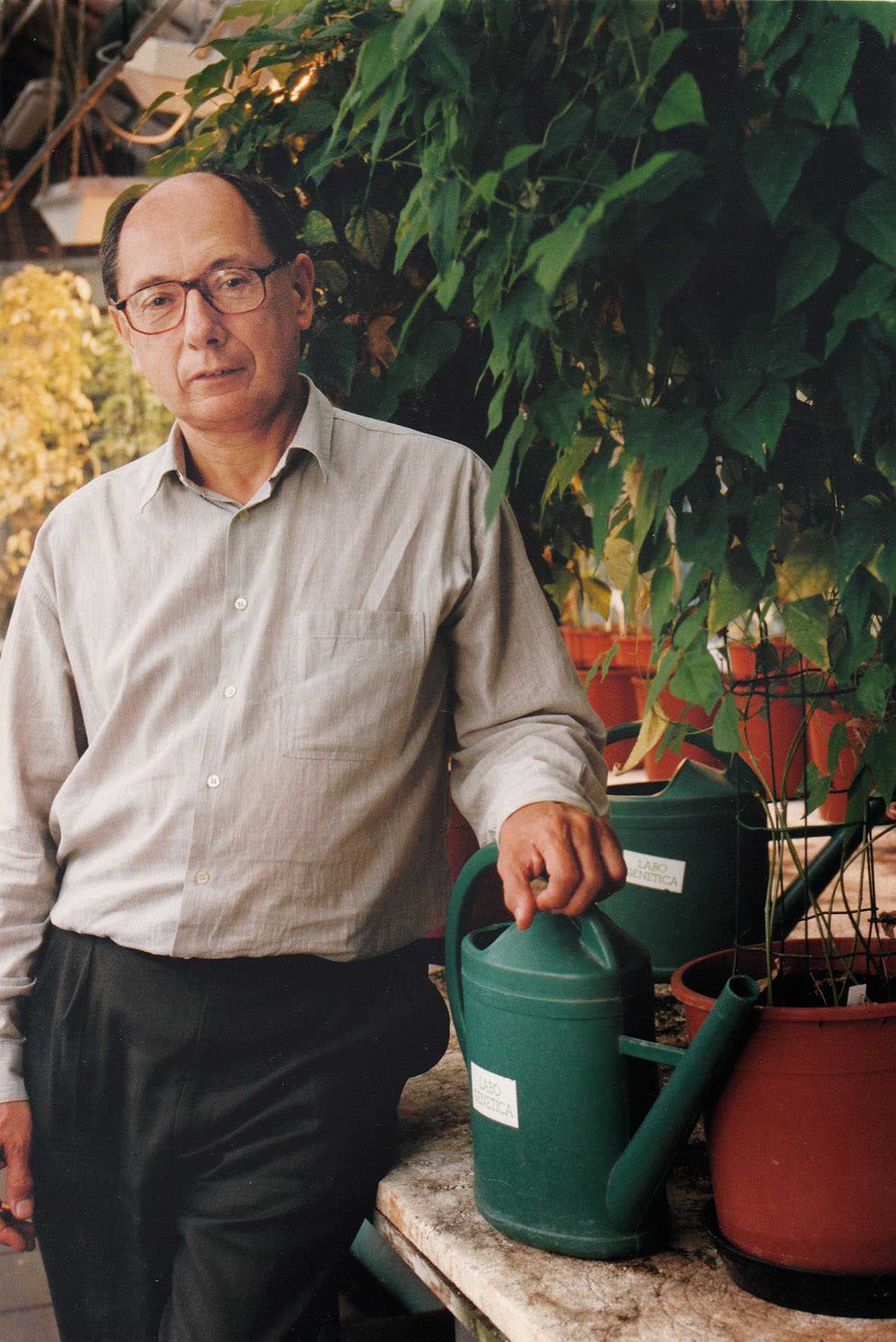
Marc van Montagu, molecular biologist

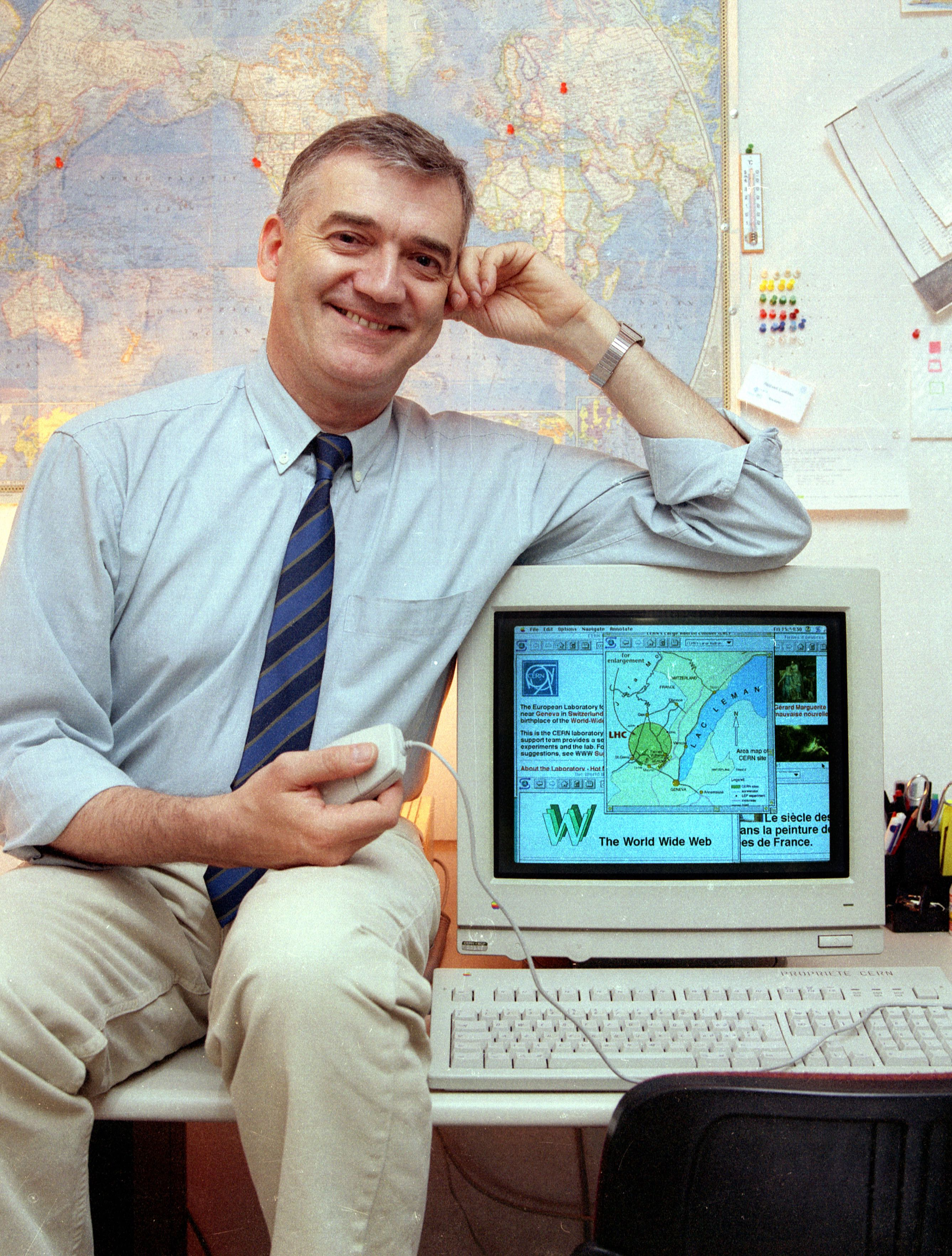
Robert Cailliau, co-inventor of the World Wide Web

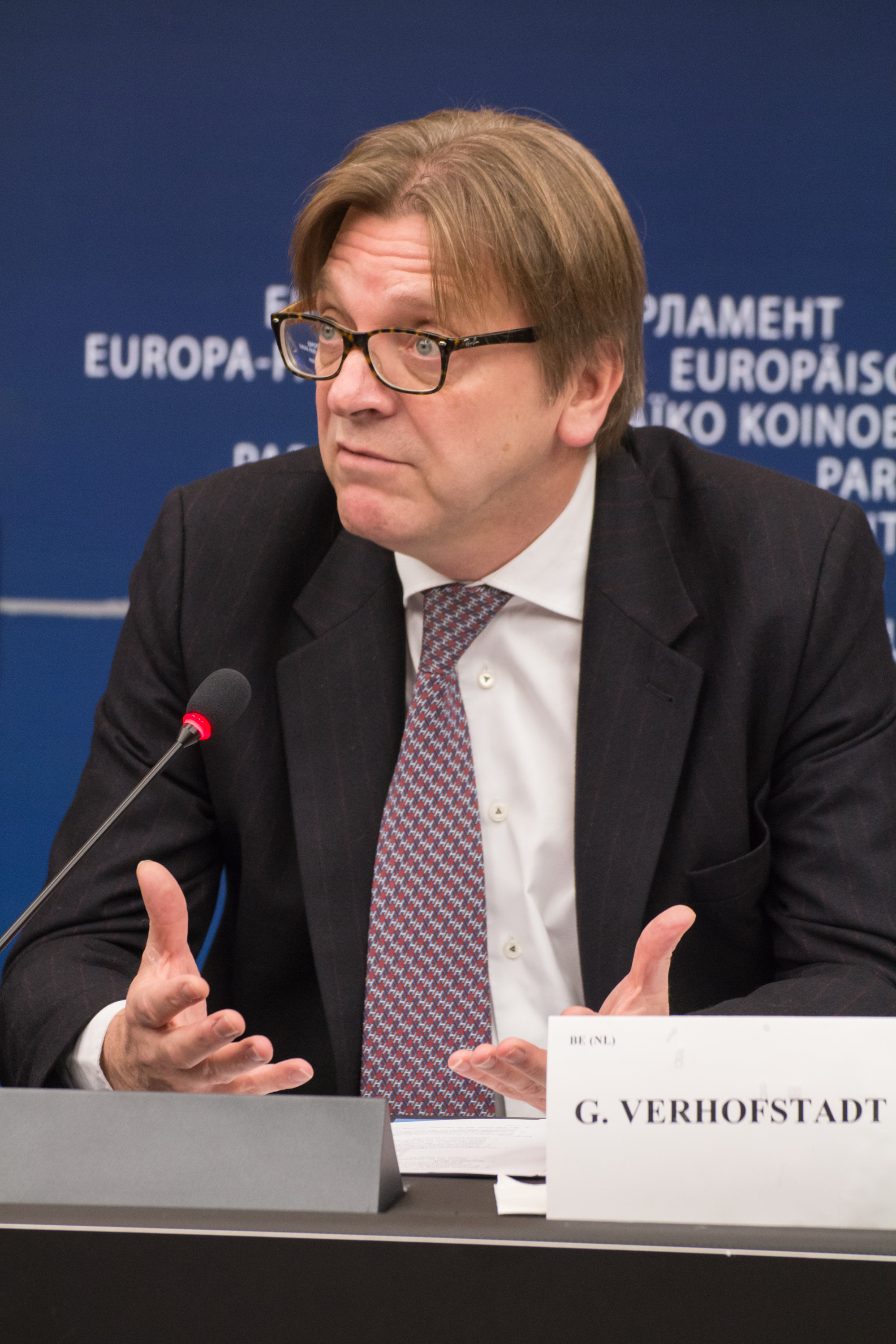
Guy Verhofstadt, politician

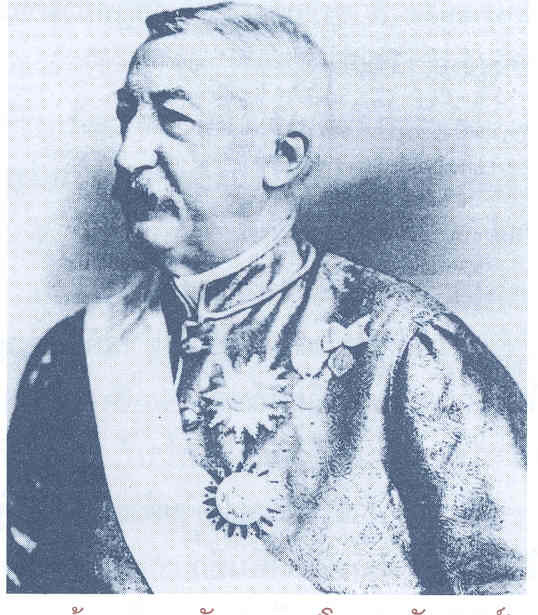
Gustave Rolin-Jaequemyns, jurist and diplomat

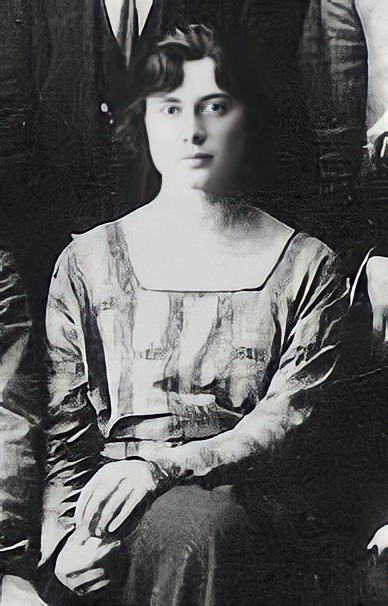
Hélène Mallebrancke (1902–1940) Civil engineer and Belgian Resistance member in Second World War

=== Notable alumni ===
- Joseph Antoine Ferdinand Plateau (1801–1883), physicist, mathematician
- Abdoel Rivai (1871–1937), physician, journalist, the first native of the Dutch East Indies to obtain doctoral degree
- José Alejandrino (1870-1951), Filipino senator and general
- Leo Apostel (1925–1995), philosopher
- Leo Baekeland (1863–1944), chemist, inventor of Bakelite
- Max Berre (born 1981), EU-based economist who specializes in valuation, SMEs and "Bridge-to-Macro" research.
- Wim Blockmans (born 1945), historian
- Thierry Bogaert, founder of DevGen
- Luc Bossyns, civil engineer
- Marc Bossuyt (born 1944), judge, professor
- Dries Buytaert (born 1978), computer scientist, founder of the Drupal CMS
- Robert Cailliau (born 1947), co-inventor of the World Wide Web
- Luc Coene (1947–2017), economy, governor of the National Bank of Belgium (NBB)
- Gerard Cooreman, former prime minister of Belgium
- Marc Coucke (born 1965), co-founder of Omega Pharma
- Franz Cumont (1868–1947), historian
- Jean Daskalidès (1922–1992), gynecologist, best known as chocolate maker of the brands Leonidas and Daskalidès.
- Pieter de Decker, former prime minister of Belgium
- Bert De Graeve (born 1955), law, businessman
- Arnoud De Meyer (presently) director of Judge Business School of the University of Cambridge
- Martin De Prycker (born 1955), engineer
- Bertha De Vriese (1877–1958), first woman to enroll and graduate as a physician
- Catherine de Zegher (born 1955), international curator, art critic, and art historian
- Rudy Dekeyser, molecular biologist, assistant director of the VIB
- Bart Deplancke (born 1975), professor at École Polytechnique Fédérale de Lausanne
- Paul de Smet de Naeyer, former prime minister of Belgium
- Martin Dobelle (1906–1986), veteran orthopedic surgeon
- Yaakov Dori (1899–1973), first chief of staff of the Israeli Defense Forces, president of the Technion – Israel Institute of Technology
- Dmitri Dozortsev, physician and medical researcher
- Edilberto Evangelista, (1862-1897), Filipino civil engineer and revolutionary
- Paul Fredericq (1850–1920), historian
- Walter Fiers (1931–2019), molecular biologist
- Leopold Flam (1912–1995), historian, philosopher
- Dirk Frimout (born 1941), physicist, astronaut
- Derrick Gosselin (born 1956), engineer, economist, business manager
- Joseph Guislain (1797–1860), physiologist and psychiatrist
- Jacques-Joseph Haus (1796–1881), jurist
- Lucienne Herman-Michielsens (1926–1995), law, politician
- Philippe Herreweghe (born 1947), doctor, psychiatrist, orchestra conductor
- Corneille Heymans (1892–1968), physiologist (Nobel Prize winner)
- Jan Hoet, (1936–2014), art historian, museum director, founding director of the SMAK
- Maksymilian Horwitz (1877–1937), Polish socialist and communist intellectual and activist
- Friedrich August Kekulé von Stradonitz (1829–1896), chemist
- Jaap Kruithof (1929–2009), philosopher
- Tom Lanoye (born 1958), philologist, writer
- François Laurent (1810–1887), jurist
- Théo Lefèvre, former prime minister of Belgium
- Marguerite Legot (1913–1977), jurist, first Belgian woman to serve as a government minister
- Yves Leterme (born 1960), former prime minister of Belgium
- Emma Leclercq (1851–1933), cell biologist
- Herman Liebaers (1919–2010), writer, former Marschal of the Royal Household.
- Suzanne Lilar (born Suzanne Verbist) (1901–1992), philosopher, jurist, essayist, novelist
- Julius Mac Leod (1857–1919), botanist
- Maurice Maeterlinck (1862–1949), jurist, writer (Nobel Prize winner)
- Hélène Mallebrancke (1902–1940), first female Belgian civil engineer to graduate from the University of Ghent, Resistance member in Second World War
- Paul Mansion (1844–1919), mathematician
- Rudi Mariën, pharmacy, chairman of Innogenetics
- Gerald Misinzo (born 1975), molecular biology, Tanzanian veterinary virologist and professor
- Gerard Mortier (1943–2014), artistic director
- Roland Peelman, conductor and musical director
- Jean-Pierre Nuel (1847–1920), physiologist
- Peter Piot (born 1949), doctor, assistant secretary-general of the United Nations
- Henri Pirenne (1862–1935), historian
- Karel Poma (1920–2014), chemist and politician
- Ockert Potgieter (1965–2021), missionary and film director
- Adolphe Quetelet (1796–1874), statistician
- Godfried-Willem Raes (born 1952), composer, performer and instrument maker
- Jacques Rogge (1942–2021), doctor, president of the International Olympic Committee
- Gustave Rolin-Jaequemyns (1835–1902), jurist, diplomat and cofounder of the Institut de droit international
- George Sarton (1884–1956), chemist and historian of science
- Jozef Schell (1935–2003), molecular biologist
- Ferdinand Augustijn Snellaert (1809–1872), physician and writer
- Herbert Van de Sompel, computer scientist
- Imre Takács, environmental engineer and process engineer
- Manuel Tito de Morais (1910–1999), electronic engineer and Portuguese politician
- Luc Van den Bossche (born 1947), law, politician
- Guido van Gheluwe (1926–2014), jurist and founder of the Orde van den Prince
- Herman Vanderpoorten (1922–1984), politician
- Hugo Van Heuverswyn (born 1948) chemist, biotech pioneer and businessman
- Ann Van Gysel, zoology
- Dirk Van de Put, businessman, incoming CEO of Mondelez International
- Karel van de Woestijne (1878–1929), writer
- Henry van de Velde (1863–1957), architect
- Prudens van Duyse (1804–1859), writer
- Paul van Geert (born 1950), psychologist
- Marc Van Montagu (born 1933), biotech pioneer
- Désiré van Monckhoven (1834–1882), physicist
- Jules Van Praet (1806–1887), statesman
- Willy van Ryckeghem (born 1935), economist
- Piet Vanthemsche (born 1955), veterinary surgeon
- Daniel Varoujan (1884–1915), Armenian poet
- Guy Verhofstadt (born 1953), former prime minister of Belgium, liberal European politician
- Dirk Verhofstadt (born 1955), publisher
- Etienne Vermeersch (1934–2019), philosopher
- Katrien Vermeire (born 1979), artist
- Frank J. M. Verstraete, veterinary dentist and academic
- Swen Vincke (born 1972), video game director and founder of Larian Studios
- André Vlerick (1919–1990), economy
- Emile Waxweiler (1867–1916), engineer and sociologist
- Marc Zabeau (born 1949), zoology

=== Notable faculty ===
- S.N. Balagangadhara (born 1952), comparative science of cultures
- Nathan Cofnas (born 1987), philosopher
- Jan De Maeseneer (born 1952), medicine, family medicine
- Georges De Moor (born 1953), medicine, medical informatics
- George de Hevesy (1885–1966), Nobel Prize winner, Chemistry
- Victor D'Hondt (1841–1901), lawyer and jurist, known for D'Hondt method
- Walter Fiers (1931–2019), molecular biologist
- August Kekulé (1829–1896), chemist
- Corneille Heymans (1892–1968), physiologist (Nobel Prize winner)
- Richard Hoogenboom (born 1978), polymer chemistry
- François Laurent (1810–1887), historian and jurisconsult
- Joseph Plateau (1801–1883), physicist
- Xavier Saelens (born 1965), biotechnology
- Jeff Schell (1935–2003), biotech pioneer
- Erwin Schrödinger (1887–1961), physicist (Nobel Prize winner), visiting scholar
- Johan Rudolf Thorbecke (1798–1872), statesman
- Jean Van Houtte, former prime minister of Belgium
- Marc Van Montagu (born 1933), biotech pioneer
- August Vermeylen (1872–1945), author, art historian, statesman
- Adolf von Baeyer (1835–1917), chemist (Nobel Prize winner), visiting scholar

=== Rectors ===
- 1817–1818: Jean Charles Van Rotterdam
- 1818–1819: Franz-Peter Cassel
- 1819–1820: Jean Baptiste Hellebaut
- 1820–1821: Johannes Schrant
- 1821–1822: François Egide Verbeeck
- 1822–1823: Jean Guillaume Garnier
- 1823–1824: Pierre De Ryckere
- 1824–1825: Louis Vincent Raoul
- 1825–1826: Jacques Louis Kesteloot
- 1826–1827: Jean Charles Hauff
- 1827–1828: Jacques Joseph Haus
- 1828–1829: Pierre Lammens
- 1829–1830: Jozef Kluyskens
- 1830–1831: Jacques Van Breda
- 1831–1832: Leopold Auguste Warnkoenig
- 1832–1833: François Verbeeck
- 1833–1834: Jacques Joseph Haus
- 1834–1835: Jacques Louis Kesteloot
- 1835–1838: Jacques Joseph Haus
- 1838–1839: Philippe Auguste De Rote
- 1839–1840: Jozef Kluyskens
- 1840–1841: Jean Timmermans
- 1841–1842: Josephus Nelis
- 1842–1843: Georg Wilhelm Rassmann
- 1843–1844: Charles Van Coetsem
- 1844–1845: Marie-Charles Margerin
- 1845–1846: Jean-Baptiste Minne-Barth
- 1846–1847: Joseph Roulez
- 1847–1848: François Verbeeck
- 1848–1852: Eloi Manderlier
- 1852–1855: Hubert Lefebvre
- 1855–1857: Constant-Philippe Serrure
- 1857–1864: Joseph Roulez
- 1864–1867: Jacques Joseph Haus
- 1867–1870: Charles Andries
- 1870–1873: Joseph Jean Fuerison
- 1873–1879: Floribert Soupart
- 1879–1885: Albert Callier
- 1885–1887: Jean-Jacques Kickx
- 1887–1891: Gustave Wolters
- 1891–1894: Adhémar Motte
- 1894–1897: Charles Van Cauwenberghe
- 1897–1900: Polynice Van Wetter
- 1900–1903: Gustave Van der Mensbrugghe
- 1903–1906: Paul Thomas
- 1906–1909: Hector Leboucq
- 1909–1912: Victor De Brabandere
- 1912–1915: Henri Schoentjes
- 1916–1918: Pierre Hoffmann
- 1918–1919: Henri Schoentjes
- 1919–1921: Henri Pirenne
- 1921–1923: Eugène Eeman
- 1923–1924: Jean-François Heymans
- 1924–1927: Georges Van Den Bossche
- 1927–1929: Camille De Bruyne
- 1929–1930: Jules Meuwissen
- 1930–1933: August Vermeylen
- 1933–1936: Albert Bessemans
- 1936–1938: Louis Fredericq
- 1938–1939: Jean Haesaert
- 1939–1941: René Goubau
- 1940–1944: Guillaume De Smet
- 1944–1947: Edgard Blancquaert
- 1947–1950: Norbert Goormaghtigh
- 1950–1953: Albert Kluyskens
- 1953–1957: Jan Gillis
- 1957–1961: Pieter Lambrechts
- 1961–1969: Jean-Jacques Bouckaert
- 1969–1973: Daniël Vandepitte
- 1973–1977: André Devreker
- 1977–1981: Julien Hoste
- 1981–1985: André Cottenie
- 1985–1993: Leon De Meyer
- 1993–2001: Jacques Willems
- 2001–2005: Andreas De Leenheer
- 2005–2013: Paul Van Cauwenberge
- 2013–2017: Anne De Paepe
- 2017–2025: Rik Van de Walle
- 2025–present: Petra De Sutter

=== Recipients of honorary doctorates ===
- J. G. ten Houten, Wageningen Agricultural University, Agricultural Sciences
- Mary Beard, University of Cambridge, Classics (2021)

== See also ==
- Associatie Universiteit Gent
- Belgian Co-ordinated Collections of Micro-organisms (BCCM)
- Flanders Interuniversity Institute of Biotechnology (VIB)
- Ghent Bio-Energy Valley
- Ghent University Hospital (UZ Gent)
- Ghent University Museum (GUM)
- Greenbridge science park
- Interuniversity Microelectronics Centre (IMEC)
- Open access in Belgium
- Science and technology in Flanders
- University Foundation
- Zwijnaarde science park
- List of modern universities in Europe (1801–1945)
- List of universities in Belgium
- List of Jesuit sites
