= Zwijnaarde science park =

Coordinates: 51.0094°N 3.71158°E

The Zwijnaarde science park is a science park of Ghent University, located in Zwijnaarde near Ghent (Belgium). The science park has an area of 52 hectare (ha) and comprises the Ardoyen campus (30 ha) of the University of Ghent and the Ardoyen science park (22 ha). The Ardoyen campus comprises several institutes of the engineering and science faculty of the university. The science park comprises a business incubator and about 40 companies employing about 1500 scientists. Most of the companies are biotech and ICT companies, which are spin-offs of the university or the Flanders Institute for Biotechnology (VIB).

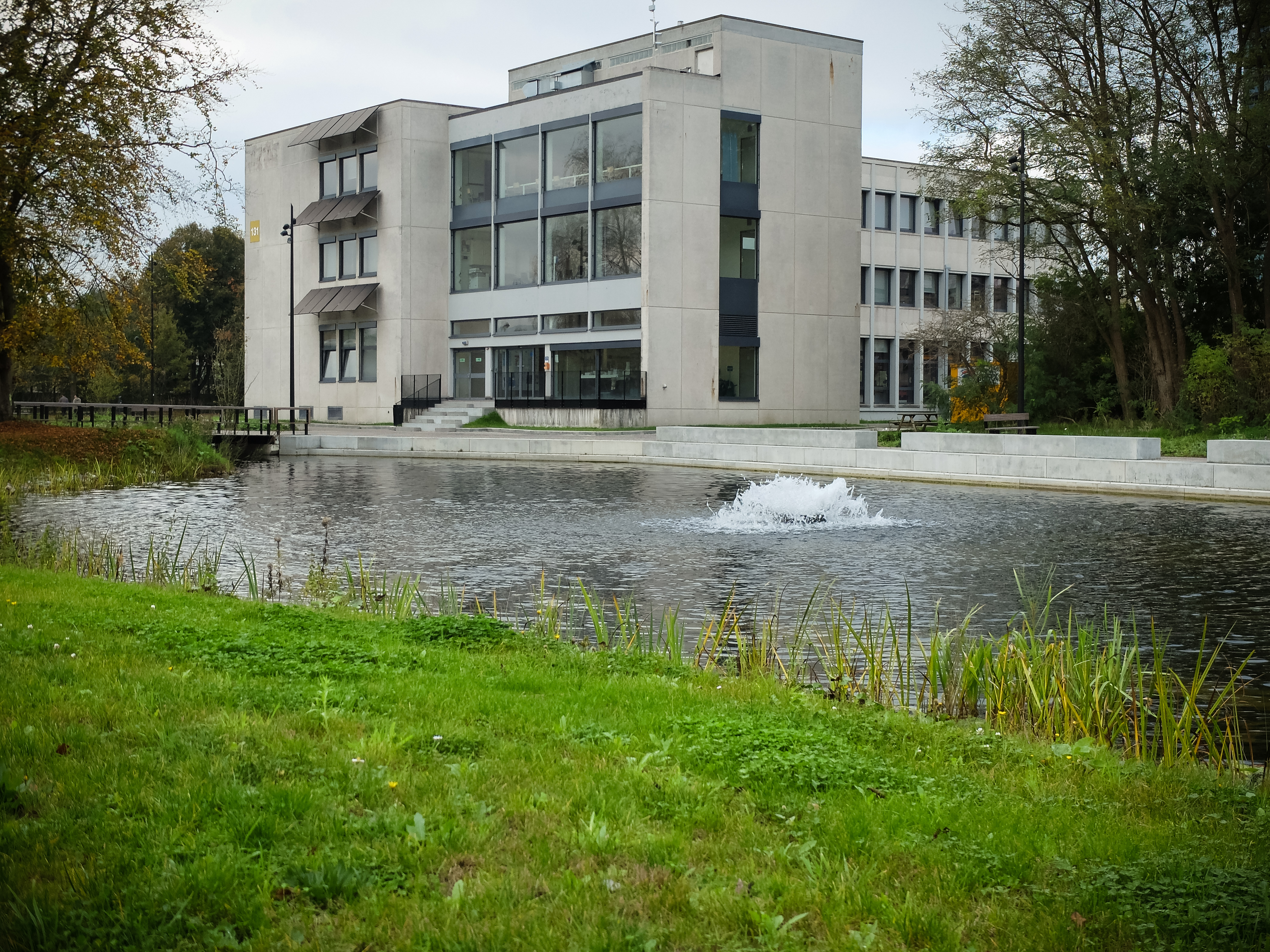
Volta building, housing part of the Department of Electromechanical, systems and metal engineering

== See also ==
- Technologiepark Zwijnaarde
- TechTransfer UGent
- Techlane
- Universiteit Gent:
  - Faculty of Engineering and Architecture:
    - Department of Architecture and urban planning
    - Department of Information technology
    - Department of Electronics and information systems
    - Department of Telecommunications and information processing
    - Department of Electromechanical, systems and metal engineering
    - Department of Materials, textiles and chemical engineering
    - Department of Structural engineering
    - Department of Civil engineering
    - Department of Applied physics
    - Department of Industrial systems engineering and product design
- IGent: Faculty of Engineering and Architecture:
  - Department of Electronics and information systems
  - Department of Information technology
- Science and technology in Flanders
- Ostend Science Park
- Innogenetics
- DevGen
- CropDesign
