= Luc Bossyns =

Belgian businessman

- Education: Ghent University; University of Antwerp
- Occupation: Businessman

Luc Bossyns is a retired Belgian businessman. He was managing director of Aquafin, a Flemish wastewater processing company. Anno 2019 he still is a member of the board of directors.

== Education ==
He graduated as a civil engineer in naval engineering from Ghent University. In addition he also graduated in company management at the University of Antwerp.

== Career ==
In 1977 he started his career as an engineer at Cockerill Yards Hoboken (Hoboken). First he worked with the Compagnie Maritime Belge (CMB) and with the Boelwerf shipyard. Luc Bossyns was director-general and director of Boelwerf Vlaanderen from 1993 until 1995 after which he went to work for Stork MEC.

During his position with the Boelwerf, Bossyns was involved in a cause of fraud with government subsidies. He was convicted in 2004, but subsequent appeals led to an acquittal of charges by lapse of time.

He was managing director of Aquafin from May 2000 until October 2016.

== Sources ==
- website Aquafin (Aquafin)
- Aquafin (Top 500)
