= Verstraete =

Verstraete and Verstraeten are Dutch language toponymic surnames. The names are contractions of van der Straate(n), meaning "from the street". "Verstraete (6,633 people in Belgium in 2007) is mostly limited to West Flanders while "Verstraeten" (5,511 people) is mostly limited to East Flanders. Notable people with the surname include:

- Birger Verstraete (born 1994), Belgian footballer
- Daniel Verstraete (born 1924), Belgian-born South African Roman Catholic prelate
- Eddy Verstraeten (1948–2005), Belgian cyclist
- Frank Verstraete, Belgian quantum physicist
- Frank J. M. Verstraete, Belgian veterinary dentist
- Jan Verstraeten (born 1978), Belgian cyclist
- Leigh Verstraete (born 1962), Canadian ice hockey player
- Louis Verstraete (born 1999), Belgian footballer
- Mike Verstraeten (born 1967), Belgian politician and footballer
- Theodoor Verstraete (1851 – 1907), Belgian landscape painter
