= Remi Vermeiren =

Belgian banker and businessman (born 1940)

Remi Vermeiren (born 23 February 1940 in Oudegem near Dendermonde) is a Belgian banker and businessman.

== Education ==
He went to high school at the Royal Athenaeum of Dendermonde and graduated as licentiate in commercial and financial sciences at the Hoger instituut voor Handels- en Bestuurswetenschapen in Brussels (evening education).

== Career ==
He started his career at the Kredietbank (KBC), and became President of the board of directors of the KBC Group at the merger of KBC, ABB and CERA in 1998. He is a leading member of the business club De Warande. He is a member of the board of Cumerio and since 2005 non-executive, independent director of DevGen.

Remi Vermeiren is one of the authors of The manifesto for the separation of Belgium (Dutch: Het Manifest voor de opsplitsing van België) which was drafted by the think tank In De Warande.

== Sources ==
- moet België gesplitst worden? (in Dutch)
- Onafhankelijk Vlaanderen geen doel, maar middel (in Dutch)
- Vlaamse toplui vragen opsplitsing België (in Dutch)
