= Unipept =

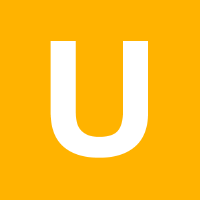
- Original author(s): Ghent University
- Developer(s): Bart Mesuere
- Initial release: 3 February 2011; 14 years ago
- Stable release: 4.1.1 / 21 January 2019; 6 years ago
- Repository: github.com/unipept/unipept
- Written in: Ruby, JavaScript
- Type: Bioinformatics, Data visualization
- License: MIT License
- Website: unipept.ugent.be

Unipept is an open source research tool for biodiversity analysis of metaproteomics samples. It also contains a tool to select peptides to use as biomarker and a tool to compare the genome of organisms based on their protein content. The software is developed at Ghent University.

Unipept consists of a web application and a stand-alone command line tool. The web application uses interactive data visualizations to explore datasets. The command line tool contains the same functionality, but is designed for use in automated data processing pipelines.
