= Bart Deplancke =

Belgian biologist

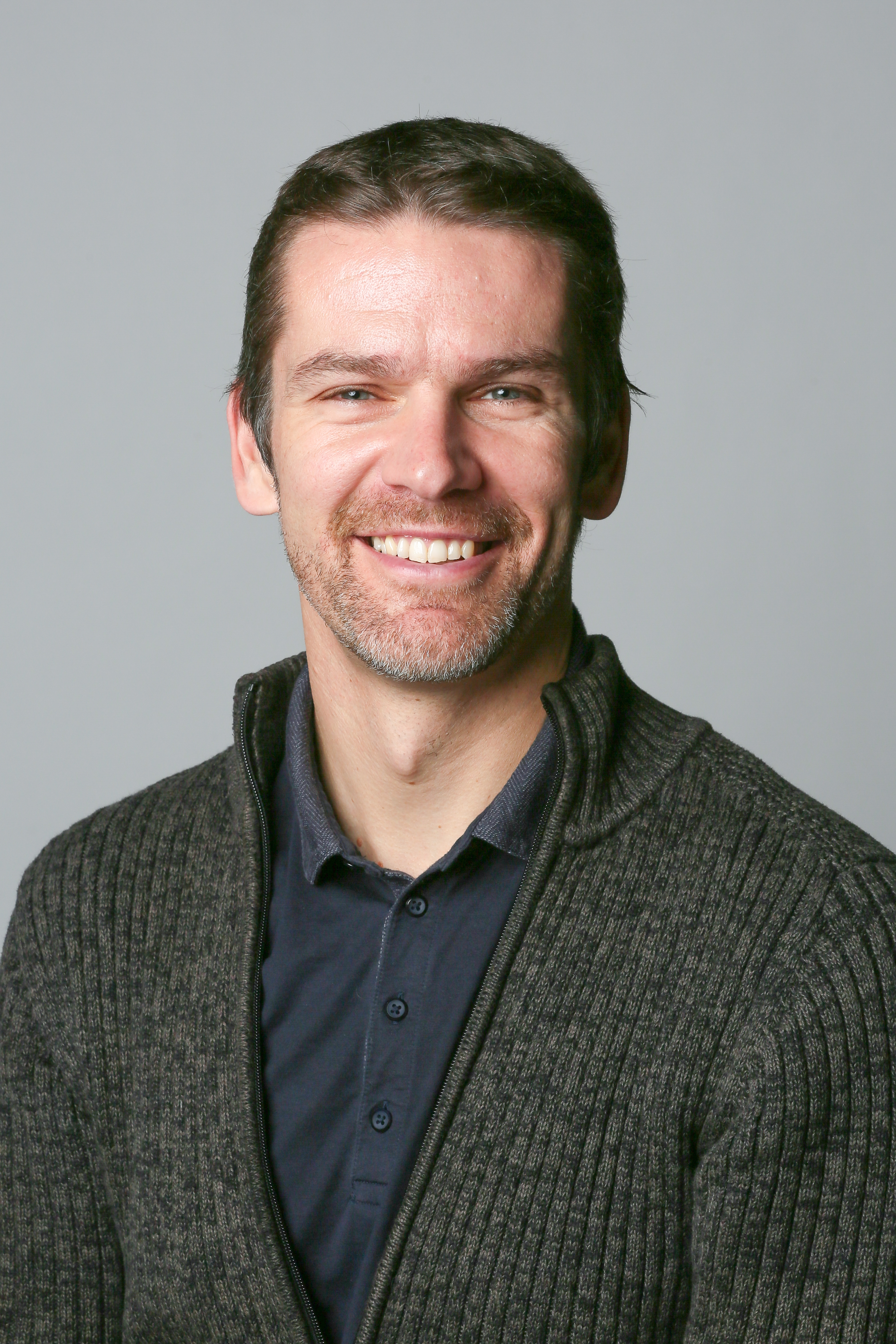
- Deplancke in 2017
- Born: August 21, 1975 (age 51)

Academic background
- Education: Ghent University; University of Illinois Urbana-Champaign
- Website: deplanckelab.epfl.ch

Bart Deplancke (born 21 August 1975) is a Belgian bio-engineer and researcher. He is a full professor at École Polytechnique Fédérale de Lausanne, where he leads the laboratory of systems biology and genetics.

== Career ==
Deplancke studied biochemical engineering at Ghent University and graduated with a Master of Science in 1998. In 2002, he obtained a Doctor of Philosophy in immunobiology from the University of Illinois Urbana-Champaign for his studies on intestinal host-microbe interactions and innate immunity. He then pursued postdoctoral studies in the laboratories of Marc Vidal (Harvard Medical School) and Marian Walhout (University of Massachusetts), where he developed a high-throughput protein-DNA interaction screening approach and worked on elucidating metazoan genetic regulatory networks. In 2007, he established his own lab at École Polytechnique Fédérale de Lausanne, where he was successively promoted to associate professor in 2014, and to full professor in 2020. He is currently vice-dean for innovation there. He is a cofounder of the Junior European Drosophila Investigators (JEDI) scientific network. Since 2013, Deplancke is a group leader at the Swiss Institute of Bioinformatics.

== Research ==
The laboratory of Bart Deplancke develops microfluidics, high-throughput sequencing, and single cell genomics tools to study the origin, diversity and functions of stromal cells in adipose tissues as well as to better understand how genomic variations may affect molecular and organismal diversity, with a specific focus on metabolic phenotypes. In particular, Deplancke uses adipogenesis as a model system to better understand the regulatory networks driving cellular differentiation, focusing on the role of transcription factors and transcriptional co-regulators.

Using single cell transcriptomics, Deplancke's team discovered the previously unknown adipogenesis-regulatory cells (Aregs), which are endowed with the ability to suppress adipogenesis, a finding that may have important implications for the treatment of chronic metabolic disorders such as obesity or type 2 diabetes. Deplancke's lab has also contributed to the understanding that non-coding genetic variants have broader impact on molecular and organismal diversity than previously expected, thus introducing the concept of variable chromatin modules (VCMs).

Together with the laboratory of Trudy Mackay, Deplancke and colleagues characterized the Drosophila Genetic Reference Panel, with the aim to improve the robustness of genotype to phenotype relationship studies, allowing elucidation of important genetic principles underlying variation in gut immunocompetence.

== Innovation ==
In 2011, Deplancke co-founded Genohm, a company delivering software (big data management) products and services for pharmaceutical and R&D laboratories, which was acquired by Agilent in May 2018.

In 2020, he co-founded Alithea Genomics, a company specializing in making high-throughput transcriptomics highly affordable for academic projects, biobank functionalization, and drug screening platforms.

== Distinctions ==
In 2005, Deplancke received the Peter Reeds Young Investigator Award from the American Society for Nutritional Sciences for his work on the impact of genetic factors in response to bacterial infections.

In 2017, he was elected to the National Research Council of the Swiss National Science Foundation.
