= Thierry Bogaert =

Belgian scientist and businessman

Thierry Bogaert is a Belgian scientist and businessman. He founded the Belgian biotech company, "Devgen" in 1997 and was its managing director and CEO from 1997 onwards, until he sold the it to Syngenta in 2012 for 400m EUR. During this time he led the science and business strategy of the company and took Devgen public on Euronext in 2005. Building on genetics as its core scientific strength, he developed Devgen into a leading provider of new crop protection technologies to the Agro industry and an Asian seed company that fundamentally redesigned Hybrid Rice delivering a pipeline of high yielding products for Indian and South East Asian markets. Prior to its sale to Syngenta, Devgen seeds were produced on >8000 ha and sold in ~20,000 retail shops across India, Indonesia and Philippines.

== Education ==
He graduated from the University of Ghent (Ghent, Belgium) and received an MSc degree form the University of Manitoba (Winnipeg, Manitoba, Canada). He obtained a PhD at the Laboratory of Molecular Biology, Medical Research Council, (Cambridge, United Kingdom).

== Career ==
As an academic, he held faculty positions at the Laboratory of Molecular Biology of the Medical Research Council (MRC-LMB) in Cambridge and the Medical Faculty of the University of Ghent. His research interest was about Drosophila melanogaster integrins and a Caenorhabditis elegans UNC gene (uncoordinated phenotype).

In 1997, he founded DevGen and became its chief executive officer.

== Sources ==
- Gents biotechbedrijf laat insecten zelfmoord plegen
- Thierry Bogaert
