= Greenbridge science park =

Coordinates: 51°13′2.36″N 2°59′38.74″E

The Ostend Science Park is a business incubator and science park of located on the Plassendale site in Ostend (Belgium). The site is aimed towards research and development in the blue economy.

== History ==
Due to the expansion of the incubator at the Zwijnaarde science park in Zwijnaarde a new location was needed, which would become the Greenbridge-incubator. Together with the University of Ghent several organisations participated in the new incubator, such as the Katholieke Hogeschool Brugge-Oostende, POM West-Vlaanderen, Plassendale nv. and ADMB. In addition the project received support of the European Community ('5B Phasing out EFRO') and the Flemish Community.

== See also ==
- Science and technology in Flanders
- Science Parks of Wallonia
