= Imre Takács =

Hungarian-Canadian-French environmental engineer

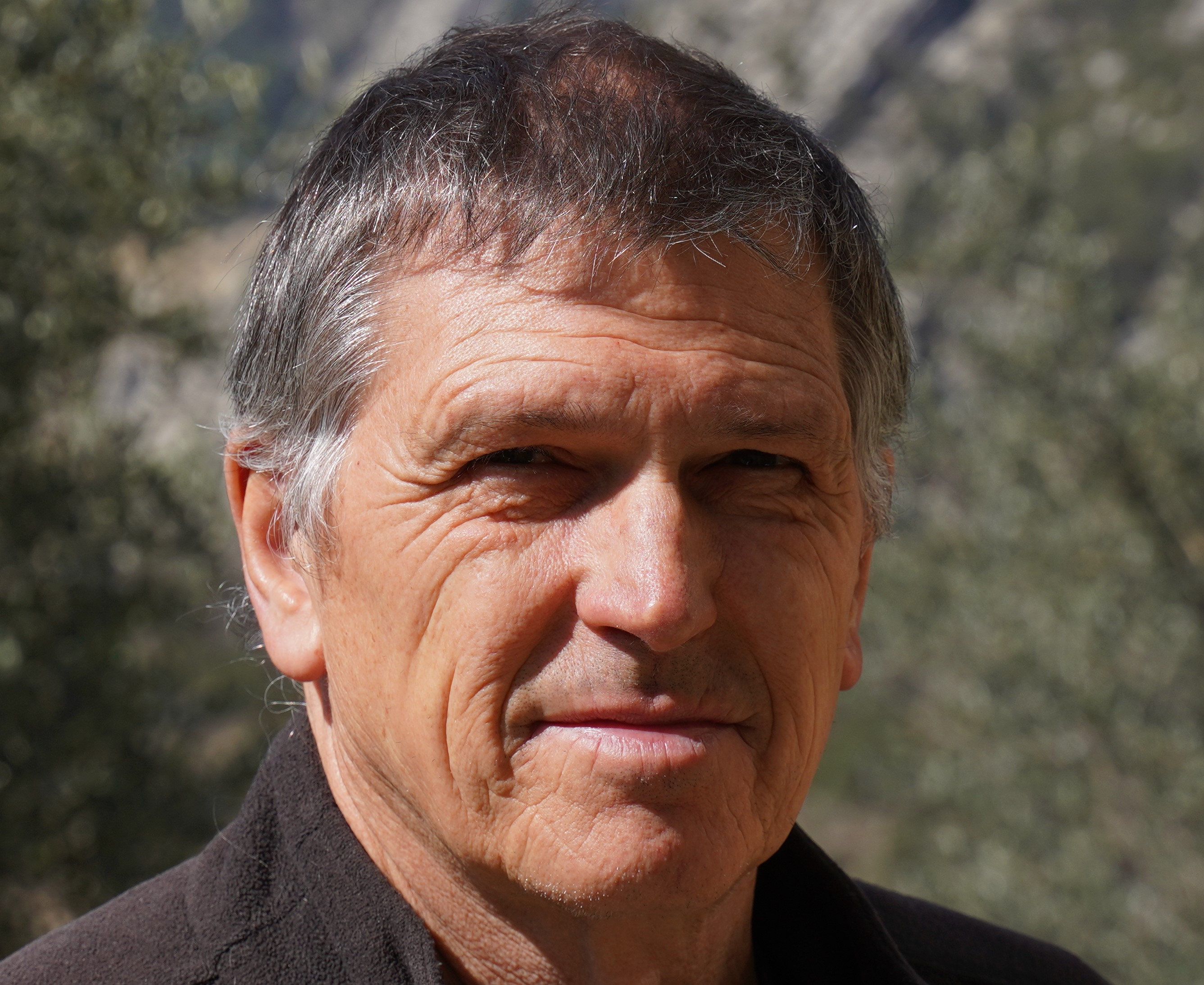
- Born: Budapest, Hungary
- Education: B.Chem., Industrial Food Processing Engineering; M.Env., Environmental Bioengineering; Dr.Techn., Environmental Bioengineering; PhD., Environmental Technology
- Alma mater: Budapest University of Technology and Economics; Ghent University
- Occupations: Environmental engineer and process engineer
- Organization: Dynamita SARL

Imre Takács is a Hungarian-Canadian-French environmental engineer and process engineer. He is a founder and President of Dynamita SAS, based in France, and developer of process simulators and dynamic models for wastewater treatment plants.

Takács has made contributions to environmental engineering, with a particular focus on biological and physico-chemical water treatment processes. He is known for the development of modeling and software solutions for water and wastewater plant control and has overseen projects aimed at implementing progressive technologies in full-scale wastewater treatment plants. He has authored book chapters for organizations, peer-reviewed journals and his paper on the dynamic process model for thickening and clarification was selected as one of the top ten most influential papers for the Water Research journal in the past 40 years. He is the recipient of the 2019 Fuhrman Medal for Outstanding Academic-Practice Collaboration from the International Water Association (IWA).

Takács has contributed to the development of industry process software, including GPS-X from and Biowin. Additionally, he introduced Sumo, a third-generation wastewater process modeling software.

Takács initiated the WWTmod (later WRRmod) conference series for modellers. He is the founder and first director of the MEGA workgroup in Municipal Resource Recovery Design Community (MRRDC) at WEF. He has been involved in various IWA groups, such as the Task Group for Good Modelling Practice (GMP) and Good Biofilm Reactor Modelling Practice, and has been serving on many scientific committees including the scientific committee for the IWA Specialised Conference on Design, Operation, and Economics of Large Wastewater Treatment Plants.

== Education ==
Takács obtained his bachelor's degree in 1978 from Budapest University of Technology and Economics, specializing in Industrial Food Processing Engineering. In 1980, he earned a master's degree and completed his Doctor of Technology degree in 1986, both in Environmental Bioengineering from the same institution. Subsequently, he continued his doctoral studies, culminating in a PhD in Environmental Technology from Ghent University in 2008.

== Career ==
Takács started his professional career in 1980 as a Project Engineer at the Water Quality Institute (VITUKI, Hungary), where he served until 1988 while also maintaining a position at VIZITERV in 1983. Following this, he assumed the role of Head of R&D at Hydromantis, and from 2002 to 2008, he served at EnviroSim Associates, followed by two years where he was assigned a managerial position within their European subsidiary office. In 2010, he founded Dynamita, a software and process modelling company and has since served as its CEO.

Takács held the role of Project Manager for numerous projects including for DCWATER's Blue Plains plant and HRSD's Nansemond plant at Norfolk.

Takács is a Water-Energy Nexus (WEX) fellow with the University of California at Irvine (UCI). He held a part-time professorship within the Geology department from 1994 to 2002. Prior to that he worked as a Research Engineer at McMaster University between 1988 and 1991.

=== Contributions ===
Takács has been involved with projects of environmental software development, process optimization, and advanced control systems. He played a key role in the development of environmental software packages like VNP, GPS-X, BioWin and SUMO. His work extended to the Blue Plains facility, where he devised characterization methods for optimizing carbon source dosing and anaerobic digestion modeling.

== Research ==
Takács developed new concepts in process modeling including settling, chemical and biological phosphorus removal, side-stream treatment, carbon capture for energy recovery, biofilms, granules and granulation, equilibrium chemistry, natural and engineered precipitation, such as for nutrient recovery.

=== Wastewater treatment models ===
Takács' research on wastewater treatment modeling has emphasized the improvement of modeling techniques and data quality. He introduced a dynamic model for the clarification-thickening process, employing experimental data from various experiments. In 2008, he critically assessed various model concepts for nitrite modeling in processes like two-step denitrification, anaerobic ammonium oxidation, and phosphorus uptake, highlighting the need for further development. Furthermore, he authored a book chapter in Biological Wastewater Treatment: Principles, Modelling, and Design, which focused on final settling tanks to emphasize the practical aspects, design, and operation of phase separation units. He also contributed to a collaborative effort proposing a standardized notation system for naming state variables in biokinetic models, aiming for consistent rules across existing and future models. In a paper published for the Water Environment Research, his work involved the development of a phosphate complexation model which utilized geochemical reactions on hydrous ferric oxide (HFO) surfaces to comprehend the process of chemically mediated phosphate removal.

Takács has conducted research addressing the critical issue of data reconciliation in wastewater treatment modeling, offering an approach for obtaining reliable data sets for model-based studies. He investigated the sensitivity of nitrite transfer between aerobic and anaerobic ammonia oxidizers highlighting the significance of selecting an appropriate sludge retention time. Alongside fellow researchers, he introduced a dynamic physico-chemical model for chemical phosphorus removal in wastewater treatment. This model incorporated chemical equilibrium and physical precipitation reactions, effectively simulating observed bulk dynamics in terms of pH.

=== Verification and calibration of activated sludge models ===
Takács has conducted in-depth studies of Activated Sludge Models and its practical applications. In his research about the respirometric experiments for calibrating ASM1, he emphasized the importance of different methods for assessing component concentrations. His 2009 collaborative research examined the work of the Good Modelling Practice Task Group by investigating Activated Sludge Models users, their profiles, tools, procedures, and limitations to enhance modeling procedures. Subsequently, he compiled survey responses from model users in 2008, creating a database to identify common parameter changes, ranges, and typical values for ASM-type models. He reviewed Hélène Hauduc's research, where she introduced a method to verify activated sludge models by tracking errors through stoichiometry examination. These findings led him to develop SUMO at Dynamita.

Having participated in the IWA Task Group for GMP, Takács co-authored the book Guidelines for Using Activated Sludge Models in 2012, presenting the establishment of a global framework for wastewater treatment using activated sludge models. He authored a book chapter for Activated Sludge - 100 Years and Counting, which delves into the status, history, and advancements of the extensively used activated sludge process in wastewater treatment.

=== Chemical phosphorus removal and carbon footprint reduction ===
Takács' paper on the development of a dynamic mathematical model for activated sludge wastewater treatment demonstrated the model's incorporation of the Langmuir isotherm to simulate powdered activated carbon addition. Following verification through both batch and continuous experiments, the extended model was applied in an in-situ full-scale implementation at the Nitrochemical Works. Alongside Leiv Rieger and Hansruedi Siegrist, he offered alternatives to expanding reactor volumes by conducting research based on a case study of aeration control algorithms at three wastewater treatment plants and proposed advanced process control as a solution to reduce energy use and carbon footprint.

=== Integrated biological systems ===
Takács has investigated the role of integrated biological systems in wastewater treatment processes and their modeling applications. In one of his earliest studies, he evaluated the adaptability of existing models from conventional activated sludge systems to PAC-fed systems, emphasizing the positive impact of PAC on bacterial activity, organic adsorption, and sludge settleability. He also addressed filamentous bulking in activated sludge systems and devised a dynamic mathematical model to simulate the population dynamics of floc-formers and filaments within the microenvironment of the activated sludge floc.

== Awards and honors ==
- 2019 – Fuhrman Medal for Outstanding Academic-Practice Collaboration, International Water Association

== Selected articles ==
- Takács, I., Patry, G. G., & Nolasco, D. (1991). A dynamic model of the clarification-thickening process. Water research, 25(10), 1263–1271.
- Vanrolleghem, P. A., Spanjers, H., Petersen, B., Ginestet, P., & Takacs, I. (1999). Estimating (combinations of) Activated Sludge Model No. 1 parameters and components by respirometry. Water Science and Technology, 39(1), 195–214.
- Rieger, L., Gillot, S., Langergraber, G., Ohtsuki, T., Shaw, A., Takacs, I., & Winkler, S. (2012). Guidelines for using activated sludge models. IWA publishing.
- Wett, B., Omari, A., Podmirseg, S. M., Han, M., Akintayo, O., Gómez Brandón, M., ... & O'Shaughnessy, M. (2013). Going for mainstream deammonification from bench to full scale for maximized resource efficiency. Water science and technology, 68(2), 283–289.
- Sin, G., Kaelin, D., Kampschreur, M. J., Takacs, I., Wett, B., Gernaey, K. V., ... & van Loosdrecht, M. C. (2008). Modelling nitrite in wastewater treatment systems: a discussion of different modelling concepts. Water science and technology, 58(6), 1155–1171.
