= Dmitri Dozortsev =

Russian-American physician and scientist

- Education: First Pavlov State Medical University of St. Petersburg (MD); Ghent University (PhD)
- Known for: Research Work in Human Reproductive Medicine, in particular for In Vitro Fertilization (IVF) and embryo transfer (ET) studies
- Scientific career
- Fields: Translational Fertility
- Workplaces: American College of Embryology; Wayne State University; Ghent University
- Website: www.embcol.org

Dmitri Dozortsev is a Soviet-born American physician, scientist, inventor and researcher. Dozortsev's contributions to research and publications are mostly in the areas of human reproductive medicine and biology. In particular, he is best known for his studies of in vitro fertilisation and embryo transfer. Dozortsev currently serves as President of the American College of Embryology, as Director of Omni-Med laboratories, and a consultant to physicians managing complex cases involving poor egg quality.

== Background ==
Dmitri Dozortsev was born and raised in St. Petersburg, Soviet Union. He is of Jewish descent. Dozortsev attended the First Pavlov State Medical University of St. Petersburg, where he received his M.D. in Medicine and Surgery in 1988. Dozortsev received a postgraduate training in preimplantation embryology at the Department of Embryology, Institute of Experimental Medicine. He then studied at Ghent University where he graduated Summa cum laude and earned a Ph.D. in Biomedicine in 1995.

== Scientific career and research ==
According to In-Vitro Fertilisation website source, "In 1995, Dmitri Dozortsev and his coworkers A. Rybouchkin, Petra De Sutter, C. Qian, M. Dhont have discovered that oocyte activation during ICSI is triggered by a water-soluble, heat-sensitive, non species specific cytosolic sperm factor." According to IVF Conundrums: "In another collaborative scientific study, Dozortsev, with Diamond of Augusta University and Pellicer, of IVI, Spain), have proposed theory that explains how progesterone may trigger ovulation during a narrow time-window at the end of the follicular phase of the menstrual cycle, while blocking it at all other times when administered in the form of progestins in birth control formulations. The first birth after triggering ovulation with progesterone has been reported in 2023. Furthermore, it opened the door to elucidating the mechanism of the polycystic ovarian syndrome (PCOS) one of the most common and disorder in females of reproductive age." The study was published in several phases in Fertility and Sterility Journal. Dozortsev is also credited with and introducing Term Stimulation (TM), a method to improve the quality of oocytes by increasing the duration of the follicular phase. His PGS (Preimplantation Genetic Screening) fixation techniques has been included by ESHRE PGD Consortium (European Society of Human Reproduction and Embryology) in the best practice guidelines for clinical preimplantation genetic diagnosis (PGD) and preimplantation genetic screening (PGS) and his research on sperm genetic testing before fertilization was discussed by the Nature in 2003. Dozortsev has also invented and patented a number of devices and methods for ovarian stimulation, embryo biopsy, collecting, storing, measurement and processing of DNA and semen samples.

Upon completion of his post-doctoral training, Dozortsev took on the position of Assistant Professor at the Department of OB-GYN of the Wayne State University, where he served from 1996 through 2004. Dozortsev, along with Dr. Ashok Agarwal and Dr. Zsolt Peter Nagy, was instrumental in the inception of the American College of Embryology (EMBCOL) in November 2009, where he has been serving as President since 2010 and was re-elected again in 2012 after Dr. Gianpiero D. Palermo.

== Publications ==
- Premature progesterone rise as a trigger of polycystic ovarian syndrome. Dozortsev DI, Pellicer A, Diamond MP. Fertil Steril. 2020 Nov;114(5):943-944
- Term oocyte maturation and term ovarian stimulation: impact on oocyte competence. Dozortsev DI, Pellicer A, Diamond MP. Fertil Steril. 2020 Aug;114(2):221-222.
- Luteinizing hormone-independent rise of progesterone as the physiological trigger of the ovulatory gonadotropins surge in the human. Dozortsev DI, Diamond MP. Fertil Steril. 2020 Aug;114(2):191-199
- The optimal time for intracytoplasmic sperm injection in the human is from 37 to 41 hours after administration of human chorionic gonadotropin. Dozortsev D, Nagy P, Abdelmassih S, Oliveira F, Brasil A, Abdelmassih V, Diamond M, Abdelmassih R. Fertil Steril. 2004 Dec;82(6):1492-6
- Toward pre-conceptual genetic analysis of human spermatozoa. Dozortsev D, Serafim R, Cardoso JJ, Abdelmassih S, Nagy P, Diamond MP, Abdelmassih R. Reprod Biomed Online. 2003 Oct-Nov;7(4):392-9
- An improved fixation technique for fluorescence in situ hybridization for preimplantation genetic diagnosis. Dozortsev DI, McGinnis KT. Fertil Steril. 2001 Jul;76:186-8
- Nucleoli in a pronuclei-stage mouse embryo are represented by major satellite DNA of interconnecting chromosomes. Dozortsev D, Coleman A, Nagy P, Diamond MP, Ermilov A, Weier U, Liyanage M, Reid T. Fertil Steril. 2000 Feb;73(2):366-71
- Sperm-associated oocyte-activating factor is released from the spermatozoon within 30 minutes after injection as a result of the sperm-oocyte interaction. Dozortsev D, Qian C, Ermilov A, Rybouchkin A, De Sutter P, Dhont M. Hum Reprod. 1997 Dec;12(12):2792-6
- Sperm plasma membrane damage prior to intracytoplasmic sperm injection: a necessary condition for sperm nucleus decondensation. Dozortsev D, Rybouchkin A, De Sutter P, Dhont M. Hum Reprod. 1995 Nov;10(11):2960-4
- Human oocyte activation following intracytoplasmic injection: the role of the sperm cell. Dozortsev D, Rybouchkin A, De Sutter P, Qian C, Dhont M. Hum Reprod. 1995 Feb;10(2):403-7
