= Zwijnaarde =

Sub-municipality of the city of Ghent, Belgium

- Sub-municipality of Ghent
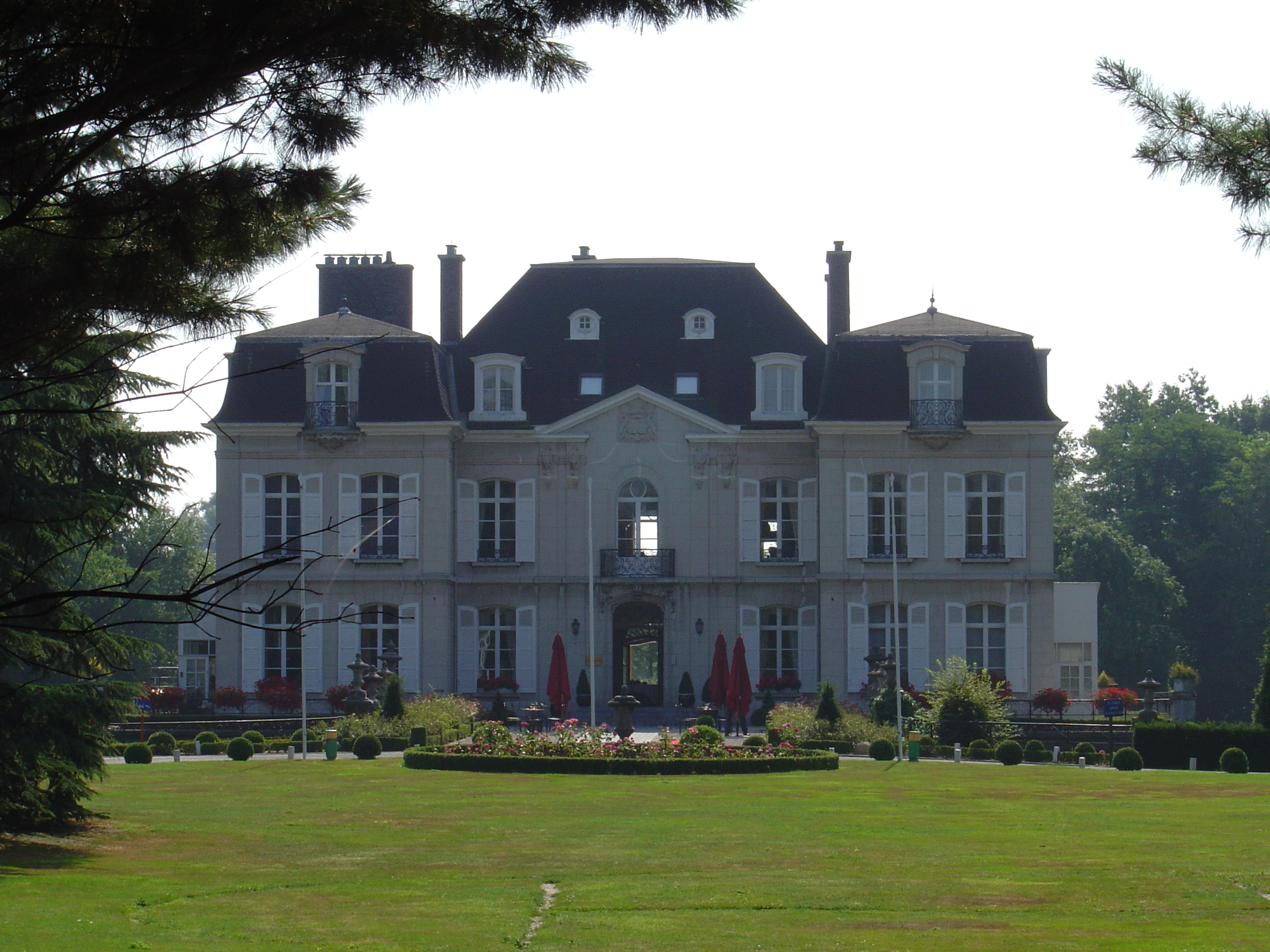
- Zwijnaarde Castle

- Coat of arms
- Interactive map of Zwijnaarde
- Location within Belgium Location within East Flanders
- Coordinates: 51°0′02″N 3°42′58″E
- Country: Belgium
- Community: Flemish Community
- Region: Flemish Region
- Province: East Flanders
- Arrondissement: Ghent
- Municipality: Ghent

Area
  - Total: 12.04 km^{2} (4.65 sq mi)

Population (2020-01-01)
  - Total: 7,384
  - Density: 613.3/km^{2} (1,588/sq mi)
- Postal codes: 9052
- Area codes: 09

Zwijnaarde (pronounced [ˈzʋɛinaːrdə]) is a sub-municipality of the city of Ghent located in the province of East Flanders, Flemish Region, Belgium. It was a separate municipality until 1977. On 1 January 1977, it was merged into Ghent.

It is known for its fair and its Zwijntjes beer. A cluster of biotech companies is located at the Zwijnaarde science park, including Innogenetics and DevGen. In 2013 at Zwijnaarde, the Flemish Institute for Biotechnology supervised a trial of 448 poplar trees genetically engineered to produce less lignin so that they would be more suitable for conversion into biofuels.

Different youth organisations are active in Zwijnaarde, such as Jeugdhuis Chaos, Chiro Ambo and KLJ Zwijnaarde.

== Notable inhabitants ==
- Karel van de Woestijne (1878–1929), writer
- Gilbert Declercq (1946), painter, illustrator and comic-artist

== Industry ==
- DOMO Group, carpet manufacturer
