= Katrien Vermeire =

Belgian artist

- Born: Katrien A. A. Vermeire; 15 November 1979 (age 46); Ostend, West Flanders, Belgium
- Occupation: Artist
- Known for: Der Kreislauf (A Handful), Godspeed
- Website: http://www.katrienvermeire.com

Katrien Vermeire (born Ostend, 1979) is a Belgian artist.

== Career ==
Katrien Vermeire studied photography at the Royal Academy of Fine Arts in Ghent and art history at Ghent University. She won the quadrennial Fine Arts Award of the Province of West Flanders in 2002. Her work has been exhibited in numerous galleries both in Belgium and abroad, including the FOAM photography museum in Amsterdam and the new Museum M in Leuven.

In 2011, Vermeire's photo series Godspeed, in which she followed swarms of fireflies in the Great Smoky Mountains photographing male fireflies flashing in large groups at night as a mating ritual, was selected for Foam Magazine's No. 28 Talent. The Wave, a photo and film project co-directed with Sarah Vanagt, premiered at the 18th Biennale of Sydney 2012 and was selected for international festivals including Locarno, IDFA Amsterdam and IFFR Rotterdam. Her first documentary short film Der Kreislauf (A Handful) won the Kidseye Grand Prize at the 2014 Rhode Island International Film Festival.
