= Jacques-Joseph Haus =

Belgian lawyer (1796–1881)

- Jacques-Joseph Haus, white marble bust by Paul de Vigne
- Born: 5 January 1796; Würzburg, Holy Roman Empire
- Died: 23 February 1881 (aged 85); Ghent, Belgium
- Occupation: lawyer

Jacques-Joseph Haus (5 January 1796 – 23 February 1881) was a Belgian lawyer.

He was born in Würzburg to Ernest-Augustus Haus and Marie-Barbe Stang. He died in Ghent, Belgium. Haus attended school through to university in Würzburg. He achieved a doctor's rank in philosophy on 3 January 1814, two days before turning eighteen. Three years later, on 26 April 1817, he was proclaimed summa cum laude doctor in civil law and in canonical law.

Around 1817, King William I of the Netherlands enacted the creation of three universities in the southern provinces of the United Kingdom of the Netherlands: in Ghent, in Liège and in Louvain (former Catholic University). As a consequence of the disturbances brought by the French Revolution to teaching in these provinces, the personnel necessary for correct operation of these universities was missing. The government was obliged to search for staffing abroad and mainly in Germany. The thing was facilitated because lessons were to be given in Latin, so knowledge of the national languages was not required. The rector of the University of Würzburg, consulted by a Dutch diplomat, designated several candidates, including Jacques-Joseph Haus. A royal decree of 26 August 1817 named him professor in criminal law and in natural rights to the Ghent University.

== Biography ==
=== Professor Jacques-Joseph Haus ===
Jacques-Joseph Haus taught criminal law and natural right until 1835. From 1835 to 1850 he taught Roman law. From 1850 onwards he taught Pandects as well as criminal law. Meanwhile, he also taught the Encyclopaedia of right, the Public law and political history of Europe.

He was rector of the Ghent University in 1827–1828, 1833–1834, 1835–1838 and 1864–1867. He continued teaching until a heart disease at the end of 1880.

Since 1833 he was registered with the Bar of the Court of Appeal of Ghent, but never practised as a lawyer.

=== The Belgian Penal law ===
Jacques-Joseph Haus is particularly known as theorist and renovator of Belgian penal law. He appeared as such by his work in three volumes, published in 1835 with the title: Observations sur le projet de révision du Code pénal. This great work is at the same time a critic of the project of revision deposited on 1 August 1834 by the Belgian government and was a counterpart project explained in 516 articles. This work could not miss drawing the attention to its author. The project of the government was withdrawn and in 1848 a new commission was established with as mission presenting a new project. Jacques-Joseph Haus, who was part of this commission, was appointed as reporter. As such the commission prepared a preliminary draft and wrote all the reports and exposed reasons for discussion for the government. His work underwent only very light modifications, so that one can say that Jacques-Joseph Haus is the true author of the Belgian Penal law. This law was published only in 1867, whereas the Ghent University celebrated its fiftieth anniversary. Haus, who was rector, was the only survivor of the first team of professors. With this occasion, colleagues and alumni offered his marble bust by Paul de Vigne. King Leopold II of Belgium appointed him grand officier de l’Ordre de Léopold and offered to him a sapphire ring, the royal figure surrounded of brilliances. On proposal of the government he was granted unanimously great naturalization on 12 and 13 May 1870. At the time a distinction extremely rare and very flattering. In 1840, he had obtained ordinary naturalization.

Alberic Rolin wrote in the Liber memorialis of the Ghent University (p. 303), Jacques-Joseph Haus was an unquestioned authority in criminal right. He was part of the commission who prepared a new criminal law and took part in setting up a new military Penal law. The Portuguese government charged him with working out a new Penal law. A national association made up in 1866 in England, for advancing social sciences, asked him to set up a project for an international law.

Since 11 January 1847 he was member of the royal Academy of Belgium and had an active role in its work. He was grand officier de l’Ordre de Léopold, grand-officier de la Couronne de chêne du Luxembourg, chevalier du Lion néerlandais and chevalier de l’Ordre de St-Jacques et de l’Épée du Portugal.

=== Principal works ===
His principal works include,

- Elementa doctrinae juris philosophicae sive juris naturalis (1824)
- Observations sur le projet de révision du Code pénal
- Exposé des motifs du Code pénal belge (3 vol. 1850)
- Cours de droit criminel (1861)
- Du principe de l’expiation considéré comme fondement de la loi pénale (1865)
- De la peine de mort, son passé, son présent, son avenir (1867)
- Principes fondamentaux du droit pénal belge (2 vol. 1874)

== Family ==
Jacques-Joseph Haus married Angelique Roelandts (4 February 1787, Aalter – 12 November 1863, Ghent) in Ghent on 13 September 1820. She was the widow of Jean-Baptist Hellebaut (8 August 1775, Ghent – 27 October 1819, Ghent), a lawyer and professor of right to the Ghent University.

Haus left four children, who all chose Belgian nationality:

- Ernest Haus
- Auguste Haus
- Charles Haus
- Edouard Haus

== Sources ==
- Notice biographique sur la Famille HAUS par Fernand Haus.
