= Jan De Maeseneer =

Jan De Maeseneer (born 30 June 1952, in Ghent) is a Belgian family physician and has been Head of the Department of Family Medicine and Primary Health Care of Ghent University (1991–2017).

In 1977, De Maeseneer graduated as a medical doctor at Ghent University and since 1978 works as a family physician at the Wijkgezondheidscentrum Botermarkt in Ledeberg (Ghent). In 1981, he started working as a part-time assistant at the Department of Family Medicine and Primary Health Care at Ghent University. In 1989 he obtained a PhD. with the thesis The functioning of 94 GP trainers at the State University of Ghent: an explorative research. His research at the university focuses on Health Professional Education, Health Promotion, Health inequity, Primary Health Care, Health Services Research and Global Health. He published more than 150 articles in scientific journals.

== Career ==
Since 1996 he has been a member of the Wonca International Classification Committee (WICC), which produced the International Classification of Primary Care, and of the Research Committee of the World Organization of Family Doctors.

In 1997, he started an international cooperation "Primafamed-network" for the development of Primary Health Care and Family Medicine in Africa and in 2008 participated in the launch of the African Journal for Primar Health Care and Family Practice.

In 2009, he became the Vice-Dean for Strategic Planning of the Faculty of Medicine and Health Sciences at Ghent University, where he was responsible for a fundamental curriculum reform as Chairman of the Educational Committee for the undergraduate medical curriculum (1997–2016).

Jan De Maeseneer chaired the Strategic Advisory Council for Welfare, Health and Family, advising the Flemish Minister (2010–2018). Chairman of the European Forum for Primary Care.

He was the Secretary-General of the Network: Towards Unity for Health.

Since 2010, he is the Director of the International Centre for Primary Health Care and Family Medicine, Ghent University, designated by the World Health Organisation as a "WHO-Collaborating Centre on Primary health Care" .

In 2012 Jan De Maeseneer became a member of the Global Forum on Innovation in Health Professional Education at the Institute of Medicine in Washington.

In 2013 Jan De Maeseneer was appointed as Chair of the Expert Panel on Effective Ways of Investing in Health of the European Commission (EXPH).

In 2016–2018, he was a member of The Lancet Commission on Primary Health Care in China.

== Awards ==
- 2004: Five-Star Doctor Award for Excellence in Health Care (Orlando – USA)
- 2008: Doctor Honoris Causa, Universidad Mayor the San Simon (Cochabamba-Bolivia)
- 2011: Honorary Fellow of the Royal College of General Practitioners (London – UK)
- 2014: Prince Mahidol Award for Excellence in Health Professional Education (Bangkok, Thailand)
- 2014–2015: laureate of the Belgian Francqui Chair, Antwerp University
