= François Laurent =

Belgian historian and jurist (1810-1887)

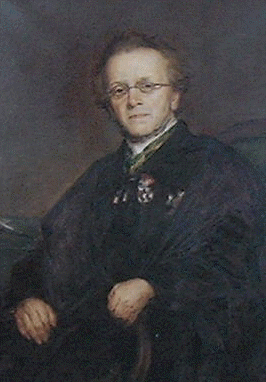
François Laurent.

François Laurent (8 July 1810 – 11 February 1887) was a Belgian historian and jurisconsult.

== Life and works ==
He was born in Luxembourg City. He held a high appointment in the ministry of justice for some time before he became professor of civil law at the university of Ghent in 1836. His advocacy of liberal and anti-clerical principles both from his chair and in the press made him bitter enemies, but he retained his position until his death in 1887.

He treated the relations of church and state in L'Églisé et l'État (Brussels, 3 vols., 1858-1862; new and revised edition, 1865), and the same subject occupied a large proportion of the eighteen volumes of his chief historical work, Études sur l'histoire de l'humanité (Ghent and Brussels, 1855-1870), which aroused considerable interest beyond the boundaries of Belgium.

His fame as a lawyer rests on his authoritative exposition of the Code Napoleon in his Principes de droit civil français (Brussels, 33 vols., 1869-1878), and his Le droit civil international (Brussels, 8 vols., 1880-1881).

He was charged in 1879 by the minister of justice with the preparation of a report on the proposed revision of the civil code. Besides his anti-clerical pamphlets, his minor writings include much discussion of social questions, of the organization of savings banks, asylums, &c. Laurent had much in common with Gustave Callier, whose funeral in 1863 was made the occasion of a display of clerical intolerance, and he founded the Societé Callier for the encouragement of thrift among the working classes. The efforts of the society were directed to the continuation of Callier's philanthropic schemes.

For a complete list of his works, see Auguste de Koninck, Bibliographie nationale : dictionnaire des écrivains belges et catalogue de leurs publications 1830 - 1880 (Brussels, vol. ii., 1892).
