= Frank J. M. Verstraete =

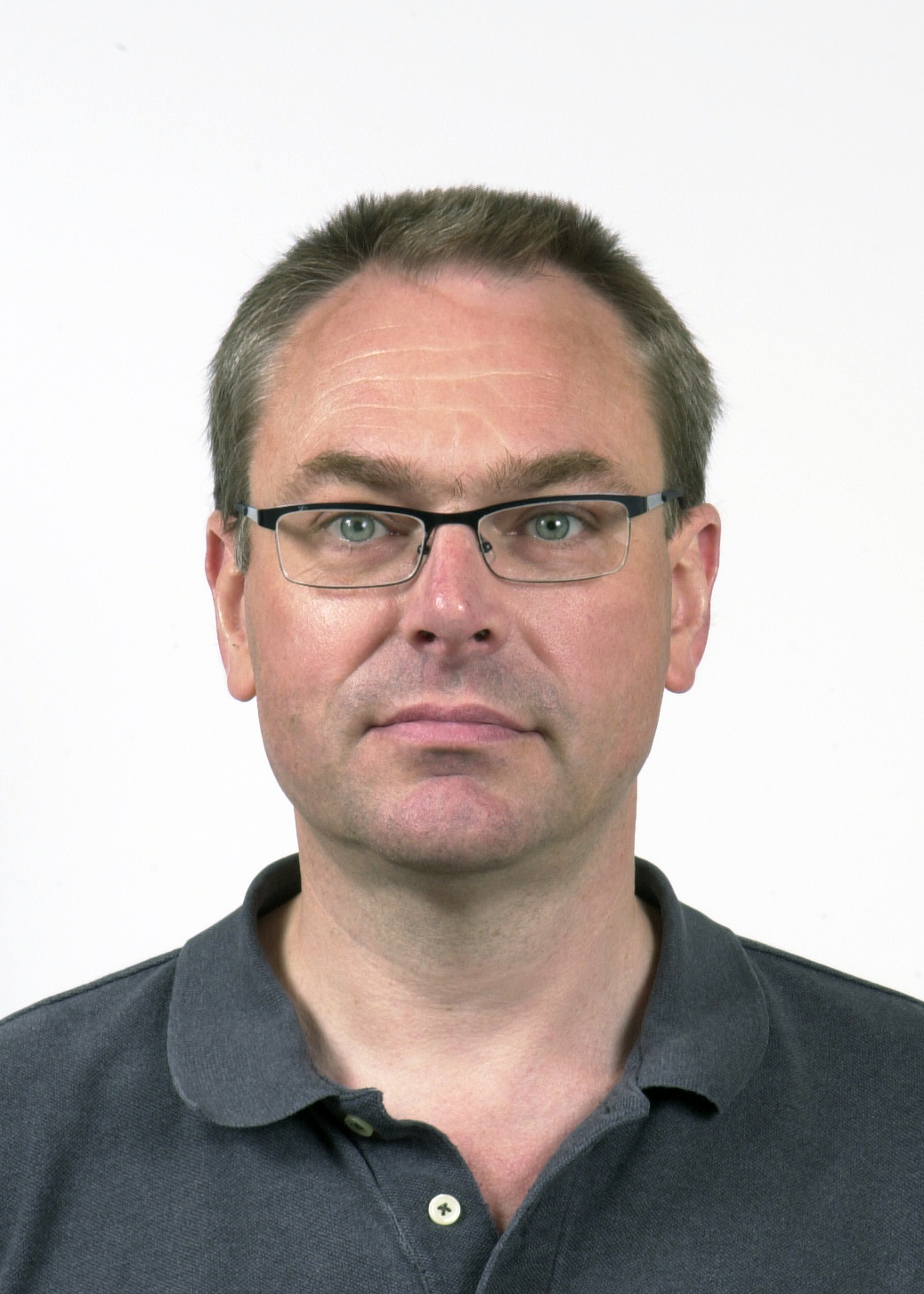
- Born: Belgium
- Occupations: Veterinary dentist and oral surgeon, academic, and author

Academic background
- Education: University of Gent, Belgium; University of Pretoria, South Africa; American Veterinary Dental College; European College of Veterinary Surgeons; European Veterinary Dental College

Frank J. M. Verstraete is a Belgian veterinary dentist and oral surgeon, academic scholar, and author. He is a professor Emeritus at the University of California, Davis.

Verstraete is most known for his works on oral pathology, comparative odontology, oral and maxillofacial surgery, and oral diagnostic imaging. Among his notable works are his publications in academic journals, including the American Journal of Veterinary Research, Frontiers in Veterinary Science and the Journal of Comparative Pathology, as well as authored and edited books such as Oral and Maxillofacial Surgery in Dogs and Cats and Self-Assessment Color Review of Veterinary Dentistry. He is Board Certified by American Veterinary Dental College, European College of Veterinary Surgeons and European Veterinary Dental College.

== Education ==
Verstraete earned his Doctor of Veterinary Medicine degree from the University of Gent in 1980 and a Master of Medicine in Veterinary Medicine from the University of Pretoria in 1985.

== Career ==
Verstraete commenced his academic journey in 1981, joining the Department of Surgery at the University of Pretoria. During this period, he served as a lecturer from 1981 to 1984, progressing to the role of Senior lecturer from 1984 to 1987. Subsequently, from 1988 to 1994, he held the position of associate professor at the same institution. Following this, he assumed the role of assistant professor in the Department of Surgical and Radiological Sciences at the University of California, Davis, from 1994 to 1998. He then transitioned to the position of associate professor at the same institution from 1998 to 2001. Moreover, between 2001 and 2022, he also served as a professor in the Department of Surgical and Radiological Sciences at the University of California, Davis, and has been a professor emeritus there since 2022.

Verstraete developed a teaching program in veterinary dentistry and oral surgery first at the University of Pretoria and then at the University of California – Davis. He further developed a residency program, where he trained residents to become AVDC and EVDC Diplomates.

== Works ==
Verstraete compiled and edited the multi-edition book Oral and Maxillofacial Surgery in Dogs and Cats, an illustrated guide aimed at improving surgical outcomes for these animals through collaboration between experts in human and veterinary fields. Moreover, he authored and edited two editions of the book titled Self-Assessment Colour Review of Veterinary Dentistry.

== Research ==
Verstraete's research has focused on various themes, including diagnostic imaging and surgery and comparative oral pathology. He pioneered the routine use of full-mouth radiography in cats and dogs, demonstrating its significant diagnostic value in identifying dental issues and informing treatment decisions, especially in older and larger dogs referred for dental treatment. He also pioneered the use of cone-beam computed tomography (CBCT) over conventional CT in veterinary dentistry and oral surgery for assessing dental and maxillofacial anatomy in healthy rabbits, highlighting CBCT's superiority in visualizing the periodontal ligament and its potential to facilitate early detection and treatment of periodontal disease.

Verstraete's research has made contributions in the realm of evidence-based dentistry and oral surgery. In a relevant study, he assessed the efficacy of root canal treatment in canines, determining it to be a viable approach for preserving teeth afflicted with endodontic disease, albeit with success rates that fluctuate depending on variables such as tooth type and preexisting conditions. Over the years, he has focused on comparative odontology and mammalogy. Throughout this time, he has developed methodologies for documenting dental and temporomandibular joint pathology in a variety of wild animals, with a primary emphasis on carnivores. His research encompasses different species, notably all major pinnipeds, five fox species, three bear species, two cat species, and the grey wolf.

Verstraete's has conducted research on reconstructing dog mandibles using bone-morphogenetic protein after surgical removal (mandibulectomy). Furthermore, his publications on odontogenic cysts and oral tumour biology, specifically focusing on squamous cell carcinoma and ameloblastoma, which are also found in humans, offer insights for both canine and human healthcare. Additionally, his research in canine palatal surgery has contributed to advancements in both diagnostic imaging and evidence-based treatment approaches.

== Awards and honors ==
- 2002 – Dentistry Award, Pharmacia European Veterinary Dentistry
- 2003 – AVDC Service Award, American Veterinary Dental College
- 2004 – AVD Award, Veterinary Dental Forum
- 2014 – American Veterinary Dental Society – Hills Research and Education Award

== Bibliography ==
=== Books ===
- Veterinary Dentistry: Self-Assessment Color Review (1999) ISBN 9781874545934
- Oral and Maxillofacial Surgery in Dogs and Cats (2021) ISBN 9780702076756

=== Selected articles ===
- Verstraete, F. J., Kass, P. H., & Terpak, C. H. (1998). Diagnostic value of full-mouth radiography in cats. American Journal of Veterinary Research, 59(6), 692–692.
- Kuntsi-Vaattovaara, H., Verstraete, F. J. M., & Kass, P. H. (2002). Success rate of root canal treatment in dogs: 127 cases (1995–2000). Journal of the American Veterinary Medical Association, 220(6), 775–780.
- Lommer, M. J., & Verstraete, F. J. M. (2003). Concurrent oral shedding of feline calicivirus and feline herpesvirus 1 in cats with chronic gingivostomatitis. Oral Microbiology and Immunology, 18(2), 131–134.
- Bar-Am, Y., Pollard, R. E., Kass, P. H., & Verstraete, F. J. (2008). The diagnostic yield of conventional radiographs and computed tomography in dogs and cats with maxillofacial trauma. Veterinary Surgery, 37(3), 294–299.
- Verstraete, F. J. M., Zin, B. P., Kass, P. H., Cox, D. P., & Jordan, R. C. (2011). Clinical signs and histologic findings in dogs with odontogenic cysts: 41 cases (1995–2010). Journal of the American Veterinary Medical Association, 239(11), 1470–1476.
- Kol, A., Arzi, B., Athanasiou, K. A., Farmer, D. L., Nolta, J. A., Rebhun, R. B., ... & Borjesson, D. L. (2015). Companion animals: Translational scientist's new best friends. Science Translational Medicine, 7(308), 308ps21-308ps21.
- Verstraete, F. J. M., Arzi, B., Huey, D. J., Cissell, D. D., & Athanasiou, K. A. (2015). Regenerating mandibular bone using rhBMP-2: part 2 – treatment of chronic, defect non-union fractures. Veterinary Surgery, 44(4), 410–416.
- Rickert, S. S., Kass, P. H., & Verstraete, F. J. M. (2021). Temporomandibular joint pathology of wild carnivores in the western USA. Frontiers in Veterinary Science, 8, 657381.
- Arzi, B., Mills-Ko, E., Verstraete, F. J., Kol, A., Walker, N. J., Badgley, M. R., ... & Borjesson, D. L. (2016). Therapeutic efficacy of fresh, autologous mesenchymal stem cells for severe refractory gingivostomatitis in cats. Stem Cells Translational Medicine, 5(1), 75–86.
