= Aquafin =

Belgium company

Aquafin is a Belgium company, based in Aartselaar, owned by the "Vlaamse Milieuholding", specialized in wastewater treatment and mainly active in Flanders. Jan Goossens is the general manager of Aquafin.

The company was established in 1990 by the Flemish government. Its mission is to design, pre-finance, build and operate all supra-municipal infrastructure needed to treat domestic wastewater. Nowadays, Aquafin manages 311 wastewater treatment plants, over 6.000 km of supra-municipal collectors and 1.390 pumping stations and detention basins. Aquafin also offers its services for the expansion and management of the local municipal system. A municipality may choose to have a long-term partnership by means of a concession or award contracts to Aquafin on an ad hoc basis. In addition, they can join the joint ventures that Aquafin has with the water companies water-link, De Watergroep (RioAct and Rio-P) and Vivaqua.

Aquafin's subsidiary Aquaplus, focuses in Belgium on the operation of industrial wastewater treatment plants. Internationally, Aquaplus offers technological assistance and conducts a wide range of studies. Abroad the company mostly operates through partners and joint ventures.

== Sources ==
- Further EIB loan finance in support of water management programme in Flanders
- Aquafin (MBR-Network)

== See also ==
- Industrial wastewater treatment
- Sewage treatment

== Gallery ==
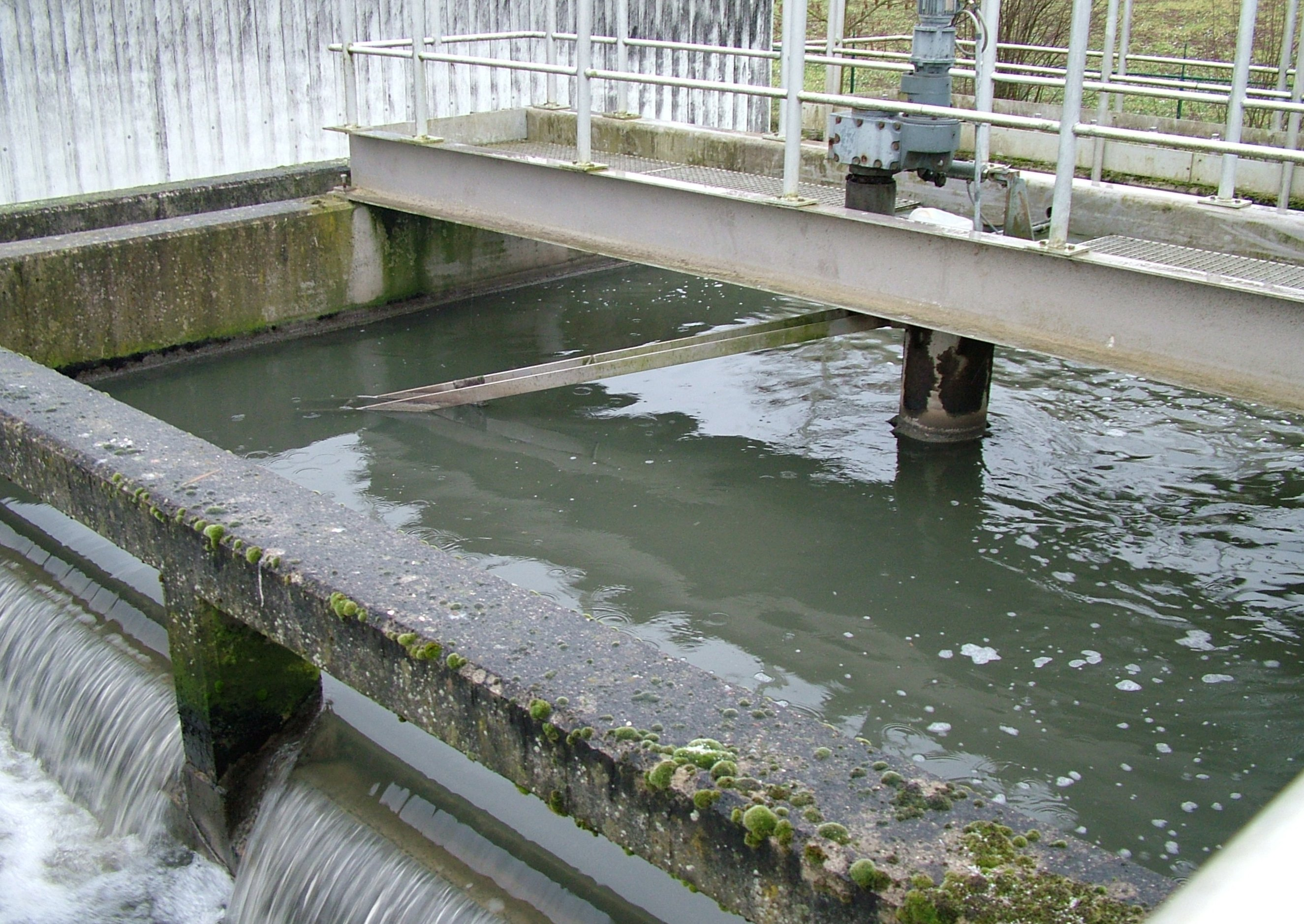
Picture of a Dorr sandtrap at the Aquafin waste water treatment plant of Huldenberg.

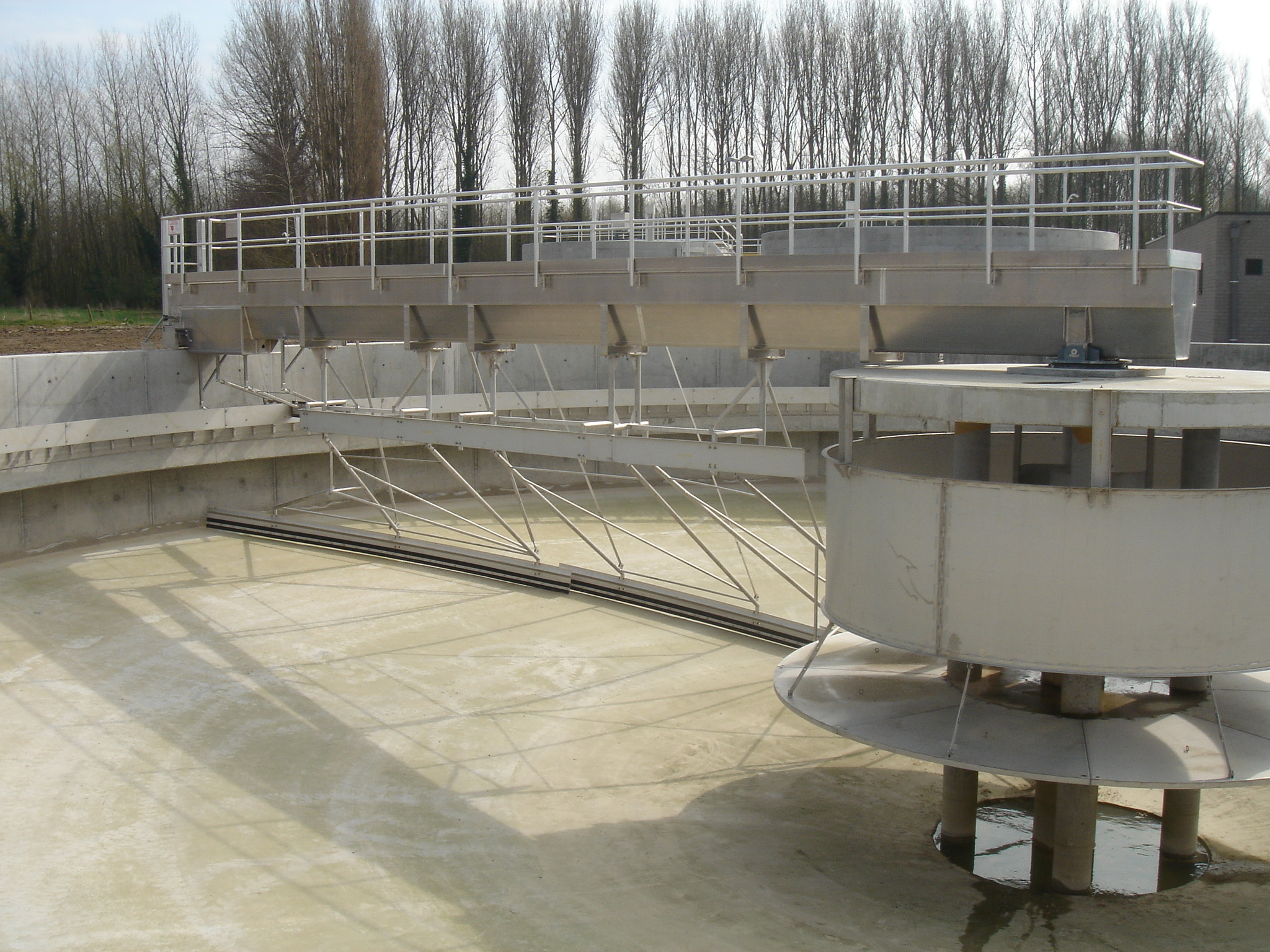
Sedimentation tank at a large scale conventional sewage treatment plant in Merchtem
