= DevGen =

Belgium-based biotechnology company

Devgen NV
- Type: Acquired by Syngenta in 2013
- Industry: Agriculture and biotech
- Founded: Gent, Belgium (1997)
- Headquarters: Belgium
- Key people: Thierry Bogaert, Founder, CEO; Remi Vermeiren, Chairman; Wim Goemaere, CFO
- Products: Pesticides, crop seeds, agricultural biotechnology
- Website: http://www.syngenta.com

Devgen is a Belgium-based multinational agricultural biotechnology company. It uses biotechnology and molecular breeding technologies to develop varieties of food crops. Its technology is marketed by outlicensing or selling seeds in India and South-East Asia. Devgen also develops nematicides.

== History ==
=== RNA interference spin off ===
Devgen was founded as a spin-off of Ghent University and The Flemish Institute for Biotechnology in 1997 to commercialize intellectual property it licensed on the use of RNAi in nematodes and its use for screening for therapeutics and/or their targets. Its work focused on the nematode C. elegans as a model system, which functions as a model for human diseases, but also as a model for the kind of nematodes that are agricultural pests.

The company raised 37 million Euro in its first three years, first from the GIMV and Abingworth investment companies at its launch, then from the IWT, then from another round of private investors including ING, KBC, Life Science Partners, Sofindex, Rendex and Mercator, then from Polytechnos and Capricorn. The received several subsequent grants from IWT.

Devgen also struck R&D collaborations over its first six years, first with Janssen Pharmaceutica in 1998 in the field of target discovery for drugs and later with Merck and Genentech in the same field, and in 1998 it collaborated with FMC Corporation for the discovery of novel insecticides, and then with other ag companies like Sumitomo, Syngenta, Pioneer Hi-Bred. Devgen brought in 23 million Euro in funding from these partnerships through 2003.

In 2004 it opened a second office in Singapore and moved into a new research building on the Ardoyen Technology Campus.

=== Seed company ===
In June 2005, employing close to 100 people, Devgen raised more than 33 million euro in a successful IPO on Euronext Brussels. Also in 2005, it established rice breeding stations in Kenya; it completed its first field trials there in 2006. In 2005 it also launched field trials of its nematicide in Europe.

In early 2007, Devgen and Monsanto announced a five-year collaboration in which the two companies would share technologies, with Devgen focusing the shared technology on the development of rice and other small cereal grains, and Monsanto using them to develop new traits for corn, cotton, and soybeans. Later in 2007, Devgen acquired Monsanto's subsidiaries in India, Pakistan, and the Philippines that developed and sold hybrid seeds for 4 crops: rice, sunflower, sorghum and pearl millet, for about $26M. Shortly thereafter, it announced its intention to spin off its pharma division. In late 2008 it fired its 19 pharma employees, leaving about 200 remaining in its ag businesses. In 2010, some former Devgen pharma employees started a pharmaceutical company, Amakem NV, to develop kinase inhibitors they had discovered at Devgen.

In 2009, Devgen and Monsanto broadened their collaboration, with Monsanto paying Devgen €20 million cash for broader rights to use Devgen's technology.

Devgen's nematicide Iprodione, was approved in the Turkish market under the brandname Devguard for use on tomatoes and cucumbers in 2009, was approved in Europe in 2010, and was approved in the US as Enclosure for use in commercial peanut production in May 2010. Devgen has a method-of-use patents for the use of iprodine to kill nematodes.

=== Takeover by Syngenta ===
In September 2012, Syngenta placed a bid of 403 million euros ($522 million) for the acquisition of Devgen as part of a wave of large ag companies buying biotech companies. The offer came six months after the companies had signed an agreement under which Syngenta would have developed sprayable RNAi-based crop protection products based on Devgen's technology. The rationale for Syngenta to acquire Devgen was stated by Syngenta spokeswoman Jennifer Gough as follows: "It's a very important expansion of our rice strategy, one of our eight key crops", she said. "We are also buying their competence in RNAi technology which will be relevant for us across a broad range of crops." Devgen's shares were delisted from the NYSE in February 2013, and the acquisition was completed in December 2013.
