= Melchett =

Melchett may refer to:

== In fiction ==
- Lord Melchett, a character in the TV series Blackadder II
- General Melchett, a character in the TV series Blackadder Goes Forth
- Terence Melchett, a character in the Agatha Christie novel The Body in the Library

== People ==
- Violet Mond, Baroness Melchett (1867–1945), British humanitarian and activist
- Sonia Melchett (born 1928), socialite and author
- Baron Melchett, a title in the peerage of the United Kingdom
  - Alfred Moritz Mond, 1st Baron Melchett (1868–1930), a British industrialist, politician and political campaigner
  - Henry Mond, 2nd Baron Melchett (1898–1949), British industrialist and politician
  - Julian Mond, 3rd Baron Melchett (1925–1973), British industrialist
  - Peter Mond, 4th Baron Melchett, aka Peter Melchett (1948–2018), British politician and environmental activist

== Other ==
- Melchett Medal, a fuel industry award

== See also ==
- Lord Melchett (disambiguation)
