= Adam Boulton =

British journalist and broadcaster

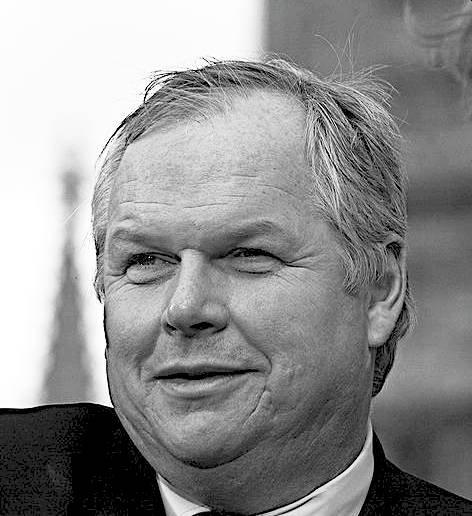
- Adam Boulton in March 2008
- Born: Thomas Adam Babington Boulton; 15 February 1959 (age 67); Reading, Berkshire, England
- Education: Christ Church, Oxford; Johns Hopkins University
- Title: Political Editor of Sky News (1989–2014); Sky News editor-at large (2014–2021); Regular panelist on TalkTV (2022–)
- Spouses: Kerena Mond (m. 1985; div. 2004) Anji Hunter (m. 2006)
- Children: 3

Thomas Adam Babington Boulton (born 15 February 1959) is a British journalist and broadcaster. He is a regular presenter on Times Radio. He was formerly the political editor of TV-am, an ITV early-morning broadcasting franchise holder.

He was also political editor and then editor-at-large of Sky News, and presenter of All Out Politics and Week in Review. He is based at Sky News' Westminster studios in Central London.

He held the post of Sky's political editor since being asked to establish its politics team for the launch of the channel in 1989. He is the former presenter of Sky News' Sunday Live with Adam Boulton, and presented a regular weekday news and political programme on Sky News, Boulton and Co, from 2011 to 2014.

== Early life and education ==
Born in 1959, Boulton is the son of pioneering anaesthetist Thomas Babington Boulton (1925–2016) and Helen (née Brown). He comes from a family of bank managers and clerks, with a medical tradition on his mother's side.

He was educated at Tower House School, a preparatory school in south-west London, at St Andrew's School, Pangbourne, a preparatory school in Berkshire, and at Westminster School, a boarding school for boys in Westminster in Central London, where he took A-levels in English, mathematics, physics and chemistry. He then studied at Christ Church, Oxford, and Johns Hopkins University, where he gained degrees in English and international relations.

== Career ==
=== Early roles ===
Boulton had early roles at IPS News and the BBC. He worked as a journalist in the parliamentary lobby, as political editor for TV-am, where his colleague was Kay Burley who also later joined Sky News. It was during the 1987 general election that he was punched by Denis Healey after Anne Diamond asked Healey about his wife using private healthcare; the incident was witnessed by gossip columnist Nigel Dempster.

=== Sky News ===
Boulton was asked to establish the politics team for the launch of Sky News in 1989. He thereby began a long tenure as political editor of the news channel.

Boulton won the Royal Television Society's supreme Judge's Award and was elected the 2007 chairman of the parliamentary lobby. On 15 June 2008, he became the first British television reporter to conduct a joint interview of US President George W. Bush and his wife, Laura. Boulton was based in Washington, D.C. from January 2009, covering the first 100 days of Barack Obama's presidency for Sky News.

On 22 April 2010, during the UK general election campaign, Boulton hosted Sky News' leaders' debate live from Bristol, the second in a series of three televised debates between Gordon Brown, David Cameron and Nick Clegg produced, in turn, and on consecutive Thursdays, by ITV News, Sky News and the BBC.

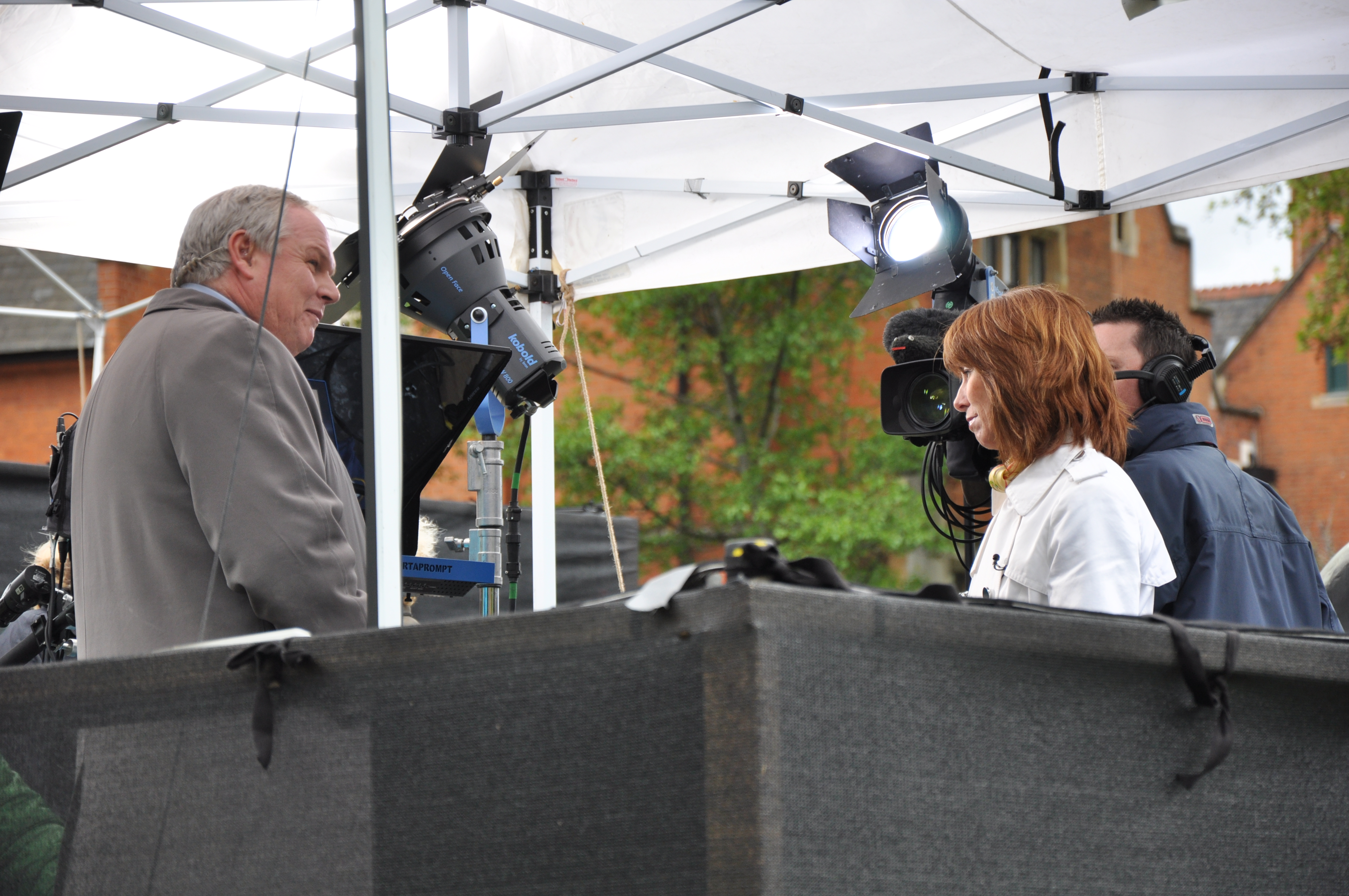
Boulton presenting Sky News with Kay Burley in May 2010

On 10 May 2010, while covering events on the aftermath of the general election, Boulton lost his composure with former 10 Downing Street Director of Communications Alastair Campbell, defending his impartiality in a live on-air interview after Campbell accused Boulton of political bias in favour of the Conservatives. Boulton shouted at Campbell: "Don't tell me what I think". At the time both Labour and the Conservatives were trying to broker a deal with the Liberal Democrats aimed at forming a coalition government. A similar disagreement occurred later on that evening in an exchange with Ben Bradshaw. The media regulator Ofcom received several hundred complaints about the Campbell incident from viewers. During the campaign, he had been asked to calm down by Peter Mandelson when he questioned him about possible spending cuts that the Financial Times believed would have to be made following the election. He was also accused of bias for the way he questioned Liberal Democrat leader Nick Clegg, it was claimed in contravention of the pre-established rules, during the leaders' debate hosted by Sky News. Ofcom rejected the complaints. On 20 January 2011, Boulton once again interviewed Alastair Campbell on Sky News, ahead of Tony Blair's appearance in front of the Iraq Inquiry. Both apologised about the incident and shook hands at the end of the interview.

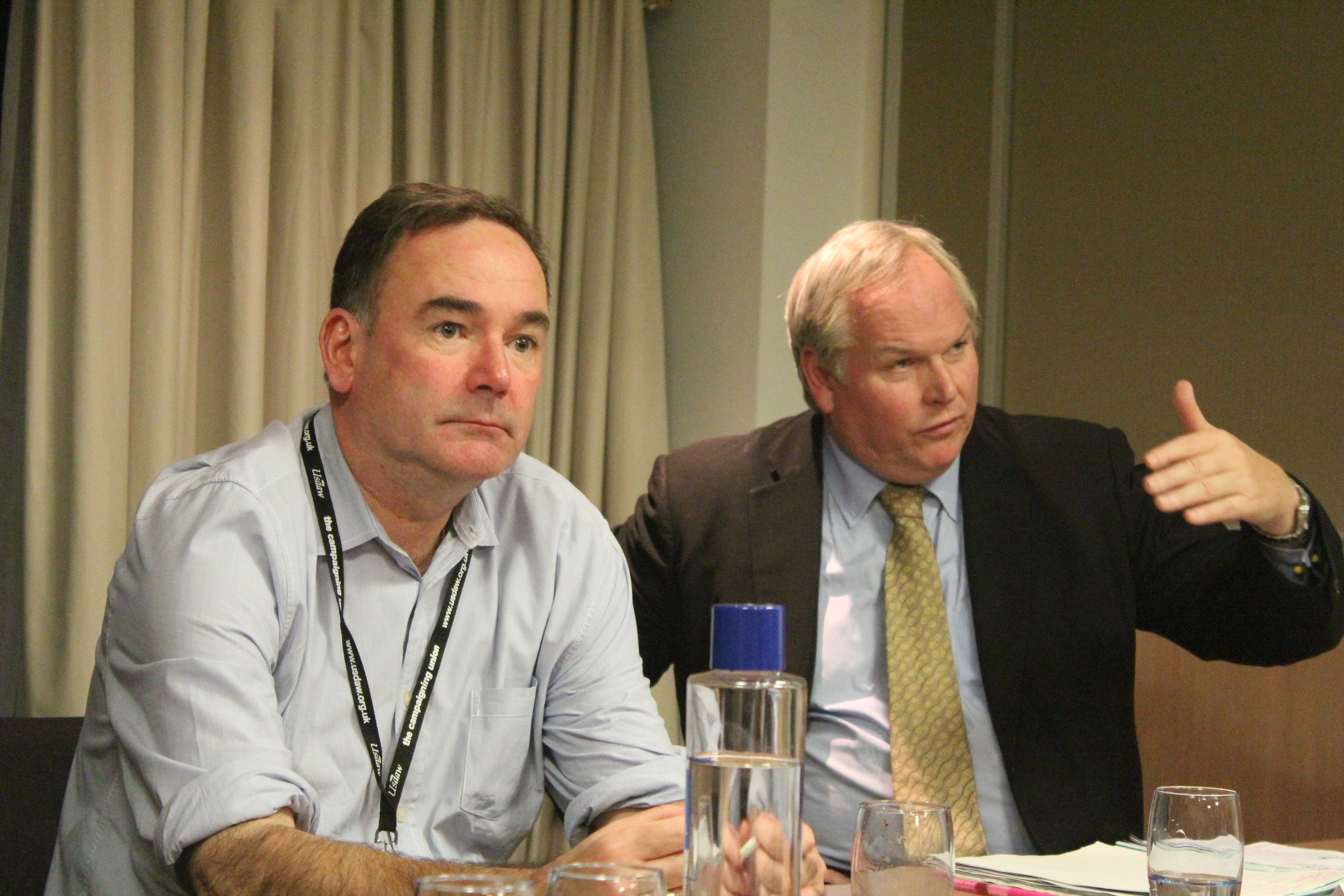
Boulton speaking alongside Jon Cruddas at a Policy Exchange event in 2012

Boulton left the role of Sky News' political editor before the 2014 Scottish independence referendum to become its Editor-at-large. He had been political editor for 25 years and five general elections. His successor in the role was Faisal Islam and then Beth Rigby, who succeeded Islam in 2019 when he left for the BBC.

Since 2017, Boulton has presented All Out Politics on Sky News, from 9 am to 11 am, Monday to Friday. He also maintains a blog on the Sky News website and presents Week in Review. Additionally, he presents a review of Prime Minister's Questions on a Wednesday evening, with regular guests to discuss the performance of ministers involved in the House of Commons earlier in the day and more seriously, the legislation and ideas that they present to the House.

He has written for newspapers and magazines including The Times, The Sunday Times, The Guardian, The Spectator, the New Statesman and The Independent. He has been a guest of programmes such as Newsnight, Bremner, Bird and Fortune and Have I Got News for You. He has interviewed every British Prime Minister from David Cameron back to Sir Alec Douglas-Home.

On 10 November 2021, Boulton announced he would be leaving Sky News at the end of the year. In an interview with The Times, he explained: "It looks like the direction which Sky News wants to go over the next few years is not one that's a particularly good fit for me. Sky News head John Ryley believes the future of news is digital, is on the platform for phones and is very strongly based around data journalism. At that point you do start thinking".

=== Post Sky ===
In April 2022, Boulton became a regular panellist on the TalkTV programme 'The News Desk with Tom Newton Dunn'.

Boulton presents a Sunday show between 10 am and 1 pm for Times Radio alongside Kate McCann.

Boulton continues to be a freelance political contributor to Sky News, GB News and Talk.

He says he has not voted for any party since becoming a journalist.

In 2013, Boulton received an honorary doctorate of business from Plymouth University.

In May 2026, Boulton said GB News should lose its broadcasting licence, arguing that the channel had committed "clear violations" of Ofcom's due impartiality rules.

== Personal life ==
Boulton married The Honourable Kerena Ann Mond, the sister of Peter Mond, 4th Baron Melchett, the former Labour minister and environmentalist, and the eldest daughter of Julian Edward Alfred Mond, 3rd Baron Melchett, the first chairman of the British Steel Corporation (BSC), and his wife Sonia Melchett, the writer and socialite.

After his affair with Tony Blair's spin doctor Anji Hunter became front page tabloid news in 2002, they divorced. Boulton married Hunter at St James's Church, Piccadilly, on 22 July 2006. Both have children from previous marriages.

== Bibliography ==
- Tony's Ten Years: Memories of the Blair Administration (2008) Simon & Schuster
- Hung Together: The 2010 Election and the Coalition Government with Joey Jones (2010) Simon & Schuster

Media offices
New office	Political Editor of Sky News; 1989–2014	Succeeded by Faisal Islam	
New office	Sky News Editor-at-large; 2014–present	TalkTV panelist 2022–present	Incumbent
