= Tite Street =

Street in Chelsea, London

Coordinates: 51.48535°N 0.16029°W

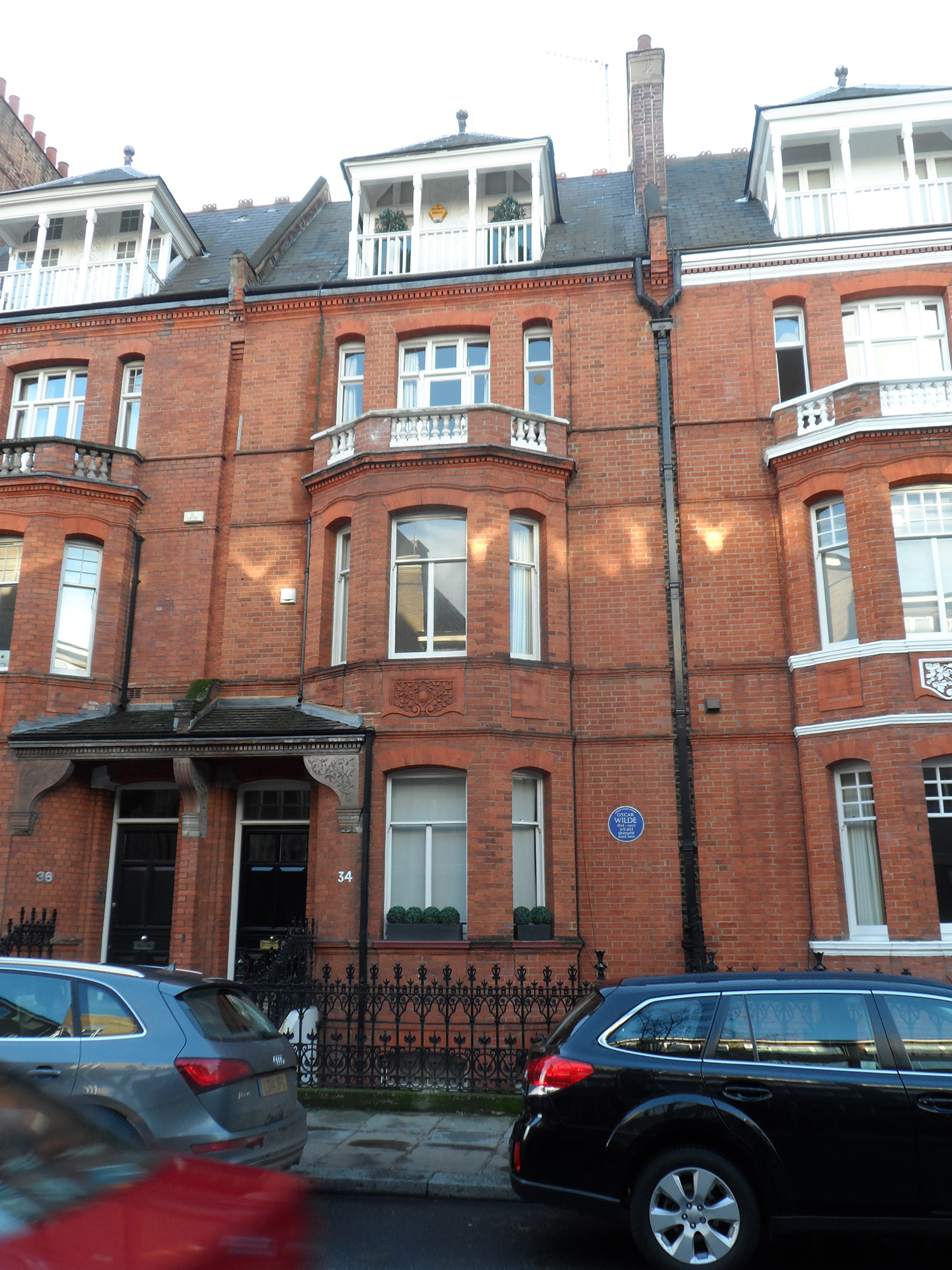
Oscar Wilde's house at 34 Tite Street, now commemorated with a blue plaque

Tite Street is a street in Chelsea, London, England, within the Royal Borough of Kensington and Chelsea, just north of the River Thames. It was laid out from 1877 by the Metropolitan Board of Works, giving access to the Chelsea Embankment.

== History ==
The street is named after William Tite who was a member of the Metropolitan Board of Works, responsible for the construction of Chelsea Embankment to the south of Tite Street.

Gough House stood on the eastern side of the street, and was built around 1707. It became a school in 1830, then the Victoria Hospital for Children in 1866. In 1898, the building was considered inadequate for its purpose. The hospital moved to St George's Hospital, and the original building was demolished in 1968. The site is now occupied by St Wilfred's convent and home for the elderly.

In the late 19th century, the street was a favoured and fashionable location for people of an artistic and literary disposition.

On 27 November 1974, two bombs planted by the Irish Republican Army (IRA) on Tite Street injured 20 people, as part of a wider set of bombings.

A private entrance to Gordon House is located between 35 and 37 Tite Street.

River House in Tite Street was designed by the church architect Thomas Garner. It has been Grade II listed since 1962.

== Notable occupants ==
The following people have lived in Tite Street:

- No.3:
  - Gustav Pope, Victorian painter (1831–1910)
  - Frank Cadogan Cowper, artist, from 1924 to 1940
- No.5:
  - Frederick Chesson, anti-slavery campaigner
- No 16:
  - Julian Mond, 3rd Baron Melchett (1925–1973), chairman, British Steel Corporation
  - Sonia Melchett, Baroness Melchett (born 1928), socialite and author
  - Peter Mond, 4th Baron Melchett (1948–2018) Lord in Waiting, Parliamentary Under-Secretary of State and Minister of State
  - Andrew Sinclair (1935–2019) novelist, historian, biographer, critic and filmmaker.
- No.18:
  - Paul Edward Dehn, writer
- No 30 (formerly 12A):
  - Peter Warlock, composer — marked with a blue plaque. Warlock died here in 1930, probably suicide.
- No 31 (residence) & 33 (formerly 13) (studio):
  - John Singer Sargent, American portrait painter
- No 33:
  - James McNeill Whistler, American painter; next door were the stables of Sir Percy Shelley, who in the 1880s built Shelley House complete with a private theatre, around the corner on the Chelsea Embankment.
  - Orrin Peck, American painter
  - Augustus John, Welsh painter, lived intermittently between 1940 and 1958.
  - Glyn Philpot, artist
  - Robert Brough, Scottish painter
  - Nelson Shanks, American painter. Diana, Princess of Wales, posed for Shanks and his wife Leona at 33 Tite Street in 1994. The portrait now hangs at Althorp in Northampton, beside Shanks' portrait of her brother Charles Spencer, 9th Earl Spencer, which Shanks painted at Althorp in 1999. Margaret Thatcher also posed for Shanks in the Tite Street studio in 1999. Thatcher's portrait by Shanks now hangs at the College of William & Mary.
- No 34 (formerly 16):
  - Oscar Wilde lived here from his marriage in 1884 until his arrest in 1895. This location is now marked with a blue plaque.
  - Hedley Hope-Nicholson and his family lived here; his son Felix Hope-Nicholson lived here his whole life.
- No 35:
  - Whistler instructed Edward William Godwin to build the White House here, but due to his bankruptcy after his legal case with John Ruskin, he was never able to occupy it; the building was demolished in the 1960s.
- No 38:
  - Leslie Haden-Guest, 1st Baron Haden-Guest, British author, journalist, doctor and Labour Party politician
- Chelsea Lodge, No.42: (demolished)
  - Edwin Austin Abbey, artist
  - E. V. Lucas, essayist, humourist

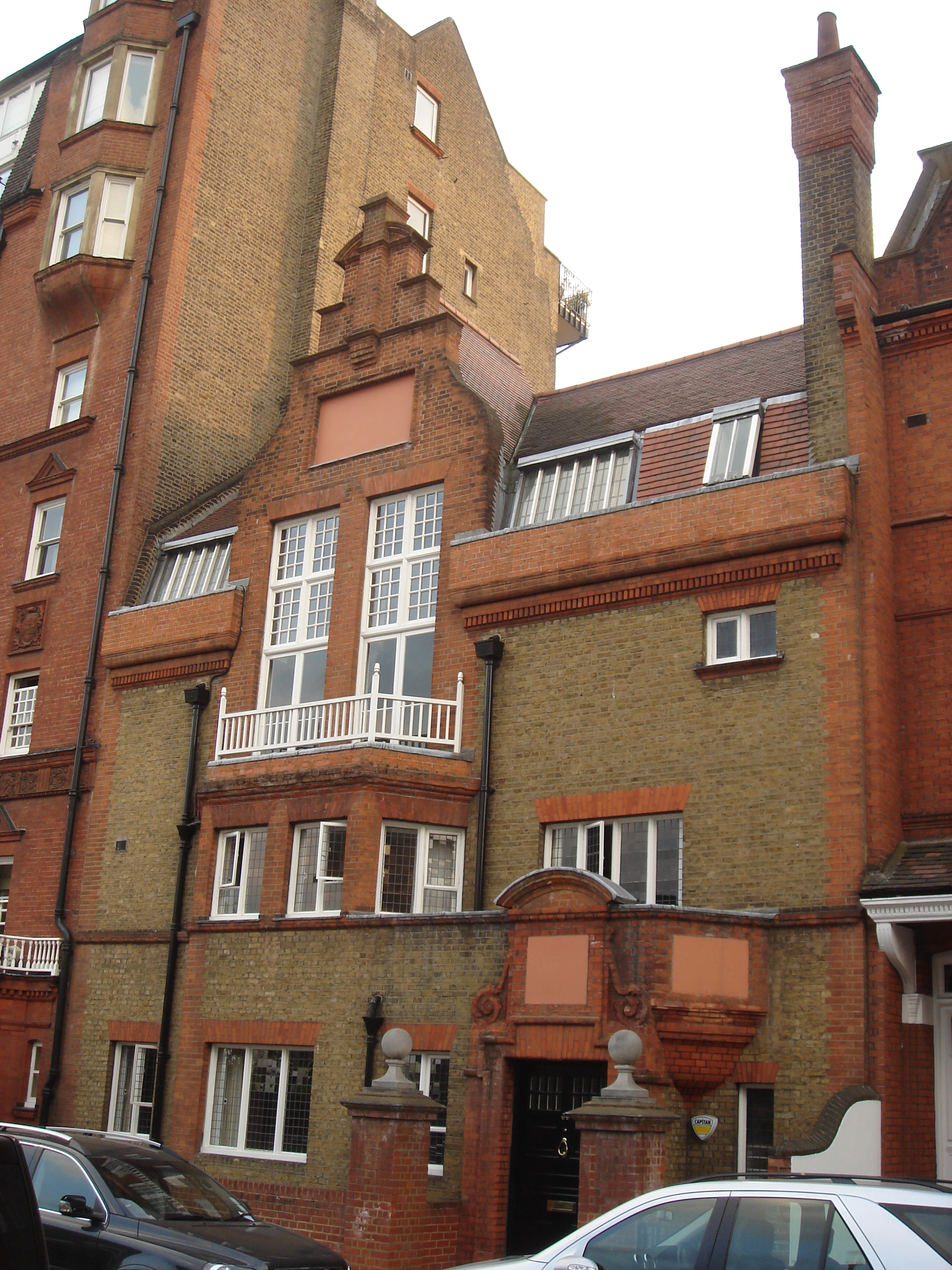
44, Tite Street SW3

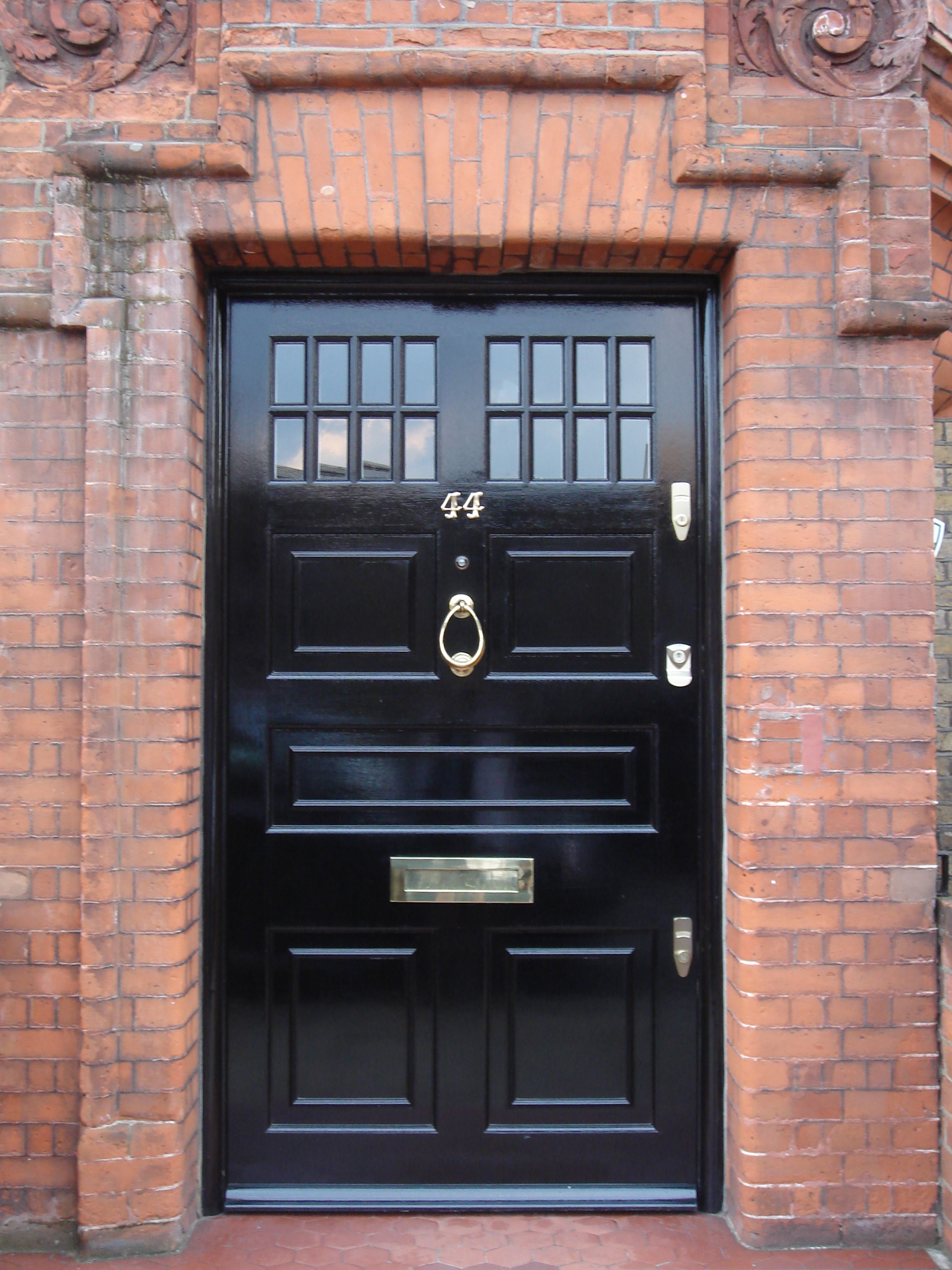
44, Tite Street SW3

- No 44 (formerly 1):
  - Frank Miles, portrait painter (also commissioned from Godwin)
  - Oscar Wilde, writer who moved into this house, built for Miles, as Miles's lodger before later renting No 34 himself.
  - George Percy Jacomb-Hood, artist, brother-in-law of Miles's cousin Philip Napier Miles, lived at Miles's house from 1897 until his death in 1929, his father having bought it from Miles's executors.
- No.48:
  - Mick Jagger, singer
- No.50:
  - Romaine Brooks, artist
  - Anna Lea Merritt, American artist
- No.52 (More House):
  - John Collier, artist
  - Wendela Boreel, artist
  - Felix Hope-Nicholson, aristocrat and genealogist
- Shelley Court, No.56. Flat No.15:
  - Sir Wilfred Thesiger, explorer and travel writer
- Shelley Court, No.56. Flat No.17:
  - Radclyffe Hall, feminist writer
- Shelley Court, No.56. Flat No.1:
  - Squadron Leader Roger Bushell RAF (1910–1944). South African-born British Auxiliary Air Force pilot, who organised and led the famous escape from the Nazi prisoner of war camp, Stalag Luft III.
