= Greenpeace Lyng GM maize action =

1999 direct action by Greenpeace

- Date: 26 July 1999; 5:00 a.m.
- Location: Walnut Tree Farm, Lyng, Norfolk, UK
- Caused by: Local and national opposition to government trials of genetically modified maize
- Goals: Removal of GM maize before it flowered and delivery of the crop to AgrEvo in King's Lynn
- Result: About a sixth of GM crop removed, none delivered

Parties
Greenpeace	Walnut Tree Farm; AgrEvo; Norfolk Constabulary

Lead figures
Peter Mond, 4th Baron Melchett; Michael Uwins	William Brigham; Eddie Brigham; John Brigham

Number
Protesters: 28	Farmers: 3; Police: Unknown

Outcome
- Arrested: 28
- Damage: £750 to GM crops; £5,000 to Greenpeace farm machinery
- Charged: Theft and criminal damage
- Verdict: Acquittal of all charges

Greenpeace undertook a direct action at Walnut Tree Farm near Lyng, Norfolk, England, on 26 July 1999. Twenty-eight activist volunteers, including Greenpeace executive director Peter Mond, 4th Baron Melchett, cut down about a sixth of the 2.4 hectare field, owned by farmers William, Eddie and John Brigham. The farm contained a trial crop of genetically modified (GM) maize owned by agrochemical company AgrEvo (later Aventis, now Plant Genetic Systems) and commissioned by the Institute of Terrestrial Ecology (ITE). While the protest was part of a larger movement by Greenpeace against GM crops, the leadership of Melchett and the number of arrests led it to be particularly well-covered in the national press.

The ITE had begun the trial on behalf of the UK Government, the biotechnology industry, English Nature, and the Royal Society for the Protection of Birds (RSPB). The maize had been modified to increase its resistance to both AgrEvo's herbicide and to insect damage. Tensions initially escalated when William Brigham told the Eastern Daily Press about the trial crop; a meeting was held in the local village hall in response, and Greenpeace became involved. Plans for a protest began when Greenpeace was made aware that the maize was due to flower within one week.

The subsequent direct action, motivated by concerns that the GM trial maize could pollute the surrounding area, caused around £650-£750 of damage to the crops, and the farmers caused around £5,000 of damage to Greenpeace machinery in return. All 28 protesters were arrested; they did not finish destroying the field and were not able to deliver the crop to AgrEvo in King's Lynn, as per their initial plan. The acquittal of the activists of all charges of theft and criminal damage the next year was seen as a "landmark legal verdict" for activism against GM crops by BBC News.

== Background ==
Walnut Tree Farm was an area of farmland on the outskirts of Lyng, Norfolk, owned by the Brigham family of William, Eddie and John Brigham, who had been a farming family for almost 300 years. William owned Walnut Tree Farm, was the eldest member of the family, and was the former chair of the Norfolk National Farmers' Union (NFU). William had accepted a trial of GM maize by the Institute of Terrestrial Ecology (ITE) on behalf of the UK Government, the biotechnology industry, English Nature, and the Royal Society for the Protection of Birds (RSPB), as part of a farm-scale government trial of various GM crops over seven plots of land, including experimental T25 maize made by the Norfolk agro-chemical company AgrEvo. English Nature and the RSPB did not necessarily support GM crops; they believed the trials may have produced evidence that would hold back GM crops from being grown commercially in Britain in the future. The maize was modified to increase its tolerance to the ArgEvo Liberty herbicide, as well as its resistance to insect damage, making it a possible alternative to the use of pesticides that featured atrazine on less tolerant maize. The Lyng crop was planted in May 1999, covered a 2.4 hectare field of maize, and was expected to flower in August before being harvested in October. Brigham surrounded the crop with a 300 metre gap to prevent contamination, which was more than the ITE recommendation of 200 metres.

30 GM crop destructions had taken place in the UK over the previous 15 months, from which 60 people were arrested and 3 were remanded. 3 of the 7 large-scale trials of GM crops in the UK were cut down by protesters. Earlier actions included the full destruction of a field of GM potatoes outside Cambridge in December 1997, during which activists engaged in a game of cricket and used the potatoes as cricket balls. Also that month, Human Genome Project members painted a large X across a rapeseed farm in Scotland, and demonstrators pulled up a crop of spring wheat in Lincolnshire. Four activists from the small group Genetix Snowball uprooted 200 rapeseed plants being grown by Monsanto at a farm in Watlington, Oxfordshire in 1998.

== Lyng public meeting and preparations ==
William Brigham had given an interview to the Eastern Daily Press about the AgrEvo deal, which prompted villagers in Lyng to hold a public meeting about the crop trial at its village hall. Brigham received a letter inviting him to the discussion but did not attend, under advice from AgrEvo. He also received a letter inviting him to a meeting between Greenpeace and AgrEvo, which he similarly disregarded. Lyng villagers would later state that the brothers had "consulted no one" before beginning the trial. The environmental organisation Greenpeace had already been opposed to the use of GM maize at the time, with Peter Mond, 4th Baron Melchett, former Labour minister, Norfolk farmer, and executive director of the organisation, being particularly vocal and attending the meeting himself; he was described by a meeting organiser as "very persuasive". Melchett wrote to Brigham after the meeting, asking him to discontinue the trial. Brigham gave another interview to Farmers Weekly shortly after the letter, and said that the maize was due to flower within one week, prompting local Greenpeace activists to begin planning to hold a protest, though the Greenpeace's inner bureaucracy was reportedly opposed to the planned action. Trials of T25 maize had been banned in Switzerland weeks earlier, further persuading Melchett to take action. Melchett would later state that "it was vital that the crop was removed before it flowered, spreading GM pollution. Locals had urged the government to destroy the crop. The authorities are not taking the correct action and unfortunately it has fallen to Greenpeace to protect everyone's interests."

13 of the 27 protesters who agreed to take part in the action aside from Melchett were volunteers in Greenpeace's public membership. They came from various parts of the UK, including London and its home counties, Cardiff, Manchester, Aberdeen, Yorkshire, and Leicestershire, as well as Norfolk itself. Of the 28 total, there were 19 men and 9 women, all between the ages of 21 and 57. Protestors aside from Melchett included a Baptist vicar, a beauty consultant, a vegan and vegetarian restaurateur, an engineer, and a mature student studying social policy and environmental science. Michael Uwins, Greenpeace's East of England co-ordinator, lived nearby to Lyng, and was invited to London on a need to know basis in the summer of 1999 to organise the action. Uwins later stated in 2020 that he was told by organisers that their likelihood of arrest was "100%".

== Walnut Tree Farm direct action ==
Before dawn on 26 July 1999, Melchett drove a wagon with an industrial crop cutter attached from his family farm in Ringstead, Norfolk to Lyng. The other 27 activists mostly traveled to Lyng from London in two minibuses. They met at a rendezvous at 5 a.m. outside the GM field of Walnut Tree Farm, and waited behind a hedge.

At 5:09 a.m., the group of Greenpeace volunteers, dressed in white boilersuits with the Greenpeace logo on the back, led by Melchett and accompanied by four journalists and a cameraman, cut their way into the field, which had been locked. They drove a tractor equipped with a cutting device with 4 ft blades, and a 3 tonne tipper truck into the field, blocked the inside of the field entrance with the truck, and re-padlocked the gate. The activists began pulling and cutting down the maize planted on the field, using their machinery as well as strimmers.

Farm owner William Brigham interrupted the demonstration at 5:25, calling one activist a "criminal". Activists began loading the removed crop into bags and putting them onto a 7.5 ton truck. Melchett later stated in court that the group intended to "remov[e] the entire crop", and to return it to its owner, AgrEvo, in King's Lynn. Melchett came to speak to Brigham, arguing that "we're just doing what people want," and that the maize was about to pollute nearby crops once it flowered. Brigham argued that he also had local support. At 5:28, Eddie Brigham arrived driving a tractor with a bucket attached, and rammed through the barred gate to the field. He proceeded to ram the truck blocking the entrance to get his tractor into the field, then chased various Greenpeace protesters, causing them to move further into the crop. He cornered and rammed the Greenpeace industrial crop cutter, and used the tractor's bucket to immobilise its rotors. Greenpeace's members were reduced only to manual labour, with all of their vehicles incapacitated.

At 5:33, police arrived at the scene, and shouted at those involved to "stop it. All of you," which was not obeyed by either party. Stating that "you've made your political points. I'd rather you stopped," the police began to arrest the protesters. John Brigham drove into the field on a Massey Ferguson tractor, which also had a bucket. More police arrived by 5:40, and arrested some of the volunteers. They did not resist arrest and were led out of the field. Melchett was also escorted out of the field by a police officer, after stating that they were enacting "decontamination of the countryside", and that they were "doing something which the public wants and is for the benefit of the environment". William Brigham chanted "Melshit. Melshit," as Melchett was escorted past him.

Speaking to Guardian journalist John Vidal at the scene, William stated that he found it "amazing that a man who calls himself a democrat and is a former government minister sees fit to take the law into his own hands," and argued that he himself had been growing the genetically modified crop for environmental reasons, as he said he had used the crops with the more "friendly" Liberty herbicide produced by AgrEvo.

John Brigham drove out of the field and rammed one of the two Greenpeace vans that were parked outside it, before chasing one of the volunteers around the field, eventually relenting. Greenpeace volunteers were made to sit in the field by the police. The Brigham brothers were also restrained by the police, and William stated that "this has nothing to do with genetically modified organisms - it's whether we want democratic government in this country or anarchy." 28 people were arrested and taken to police stations around Norfolk. John Brigham collapsed later in the day due to stress, and was taken to hospital. Later, he was discharged.

== Aftermath ==
The Guardian estimated that only a sixth of the field had been cut down by the end of the altercation. An AgrEvo spokesman accused the protesters of trespass and vandalism, and of denying the public the opportunity to observe whether GM crops were safe. Greenpeace also accused AgrEvo of planning to increase its GM plantings for the year 2000. It was found that Greenpeace had caused around £650-£750 of damage, and that the Brigham brothers, who were not charged, had caused about £5,000 of damage to the vehicles owned by Greenpeace.

=== Criminal charges and Regina v. Melchett trials ===
Melchett was charged with theft and criminal damage, and was refused bail by the court, spending two nights in a Norwich remand centre despite plans to fly to Tanzania for a two-week family holiday. The 27 other protesters were charged with the same offences and also spent the night in custody at various police stations in Norfolk. BBC News and The Guardian state that all 27 were released on bail on 27 July, though The Independent reported that 20 of them were refused bail by stipendiary magistrate Frazer Morrison. All cases were adjourned until 5 August. All 28 were committed to crown court on 19 September 1999, and all pleaded not guilty, opting for a jury trial. They were given bail and ordered to appear at Norwich Crown Court on 15 November. Melchett made several appearances on UK television, appearing on Channel 4 News for an interview with Jon Snow who asked him "my Lord, are you sure you did the right thing?"

Two court trials were held under judge David Mellor. The first was held from 3 to 19 April 2000. Mellor stressed to the jury before the trial that "this case is not about whether GM crops are a good or a bad thing," and that "it is not and cannot be about which side is in the right on one of the great debates of our time". During the trial, product development manager for AgrEvo UK Judith Jordan argued that the crops were destroyed at a loss of £17,400. Under cross-examination, she stated that the testing of the GM crops was "continuing this year". The jury found the activists not guilty of theft, though was unable to reach a verdict on whether they had committed criminal damage after a 7.5 hour deliberation, and was discharged.

On 20 September 2000, following the retrial which took 2 weeks with 5 hours of jury deliberation and involved Iceland supermarket chairman Malcolm Walker giving evidence in support of Melchett, all of those charged were cleared of causing criminal damage. Mellor ruled that the costs for the trials, totaling to about £250,000, would be paid by the prosecution. The trials were thought to be one of the largest groups of defendants tried in the same court in British legal history. During the trials, the juries accepted the defence's argument that they were acting to prevent GM pollen from unlawfully polluting neighbouring organic crops and gardens, as this fell under the Criminal Damage Act 1971; they had intended to fully remove the crop, thus attempting to prevent a greater crime of crop contamination that would have damaged another property.

Greenpeace stated that the acquittal decision was a legal landmark and that they were "delighted" by the verdict, and Melchett again called on the government and Tony Blair to end the GM farm trials following the victory, putting forward that "the government is currently reviewing separation distances imposed between GM crops and other similar crops - separation distances which we said were completely inadequate when we took action in July 1999." The defendants were awarded their costs, estimated at £100,000 for both trials, and Peter Tidey, Chief Crown Prosecutor for Norfolk, warned that the verdict did not mean future protests of a similar sort would not be prosecuted.

=== Reactions ===
Jeremy Corbyn, then Member of Parliament for Islington North, commented on the arrests, stating that the charges and holding of Melchett overnight "actually makes him and others a martyr to the cause". Before the second trial, a Nature Biotechnology article criticised Greenpeace for referring to the 28 activists involved in the protest as the "Greenpeace 28" as it said the phrase had connotations of innocence in the same way as the Guildford Four and the Birmingham Six. It also called the action "eco-terrorism". American media outlet The Washington Post argued that "the defendants have received consistently sympathetic treatment in the British media." The Observer reported that the Soil Association and Friends of the Earth privately disagreed with the action as they said it risked losing the argument over the "creeping commercialisation" of GM crop trials.

The trial's final verdict was seen as a reflection of UK public opinion on the debate around GM crops, and as a potential clearing of the way for further attacks against GM trial sites. The National Farmers' Union, in writing to Home Secretary Jack Straw, stated that the acquittal was "perverse" and that it gave the "green light" to "vandalism" and "trespass", as did William Brigham, who also said that "they used bully boy tactics to get their point across and today the bully has won". The Department of the Environment said the trials of GM crops would not cease, and a spokesman argued that "if we halted our strictly controlled research then there would be widespread GM crop planting without us getting the evidence we need." A spokesman for the Supply Chain Initiative for Modified Agricultural Crops (SCIMAC), which represented GM chemical companies, stated that it was "disappointed that an extremist minority didn't have enough confidence in the scientific strength their own arguments to let the science decide." The Independent noted that Melchett "achieved the highest profile of any UK environmental activist for a decade," following the acquittal.

The action and court trials were compared twice by The Guardian and once by The Washington Post to a similar storyline in the BBC radio soap opera The Archers that was broadcast the same year as the incident. Melchett was compared to Tommy Archer, who in the story was also charged with criminal damage after he attacked a field of GM crops, and who also prepared a similar successful defence.

Upon Melchett's death in 2018, the incident was included frequently in his obituaries.
