= Sunday Live with Adam Boulton =

Former political discussion programme, broadcast on Sky News

- Presented by: Adam Boulton with Paula Middlehurst
- Country of origin: United Kingdom

Production
- Running time: 120 minutes (10:00-12:00)

Sunday Live with Adam Boulton was a weekend news and political show on Sky News and on Sky News HD, presented by Sky News' Political Editor Adam Boulton. From January 2011, the programme was replaced with Murnaghan, a similar show presented by Dermot Murnaghan. Boulton moved to a new weekday show at 13:00 on Sky News.

== Format ==
This programme features interviews with figures from politics, business, sports, and entertainment. Sunday Live aired from 10:00 to 12:00, between the BBC's The Andrew Marr Show and The Politics Show.

Paula Middlehurst presented News summaries for the programme every half-hour.

== History ==
The programme was at first called "Sunday" and was originally broadcast from Sky News' Westminster studio. In October 2005, Boulton and the programme moved to the new Sky News Centre. Sunday was renamed Sunday Live, and interview highlights became available in the form of a video podcast. The programme ended in December 2010. The following month, Boulton began co-presenting a new weekday programme, entitled Boulton and Co, which aired from 13:00-14:00 on Monday to Friday.
