= Lord Melchett =

Lord Melchett refers to any of the Barons Melchett, a title in the Peerage of the United Kingdom, held by:

- Alfred Mond, 1st Baron Melchett (1868–1930)
- Henry Mond, 2nd Baron Melchett (1898–1949)
- Julian Mond, 3rd Baron Melchett (1925–1973)
- Peter Mond, 4th Baron Melchett (1948-2018)

The baronetcy was extinguished by the fourth when he refused marriage.

Additionally, a fictional character in the second and fourth series of the British sitcom Blackadder, was played by Stephen Fry. See List of Blackadder characters#Melchett
