= Plant Genetic Systems =

Bayer Subsidiary

- Industry: Biotechnology
- Founded: 1982; 43 years ago
- Founder: Jeff Schell; Marc Van Montagu
- Headquarters: Ghent, Belgium
- Parent: Aventis CropScience

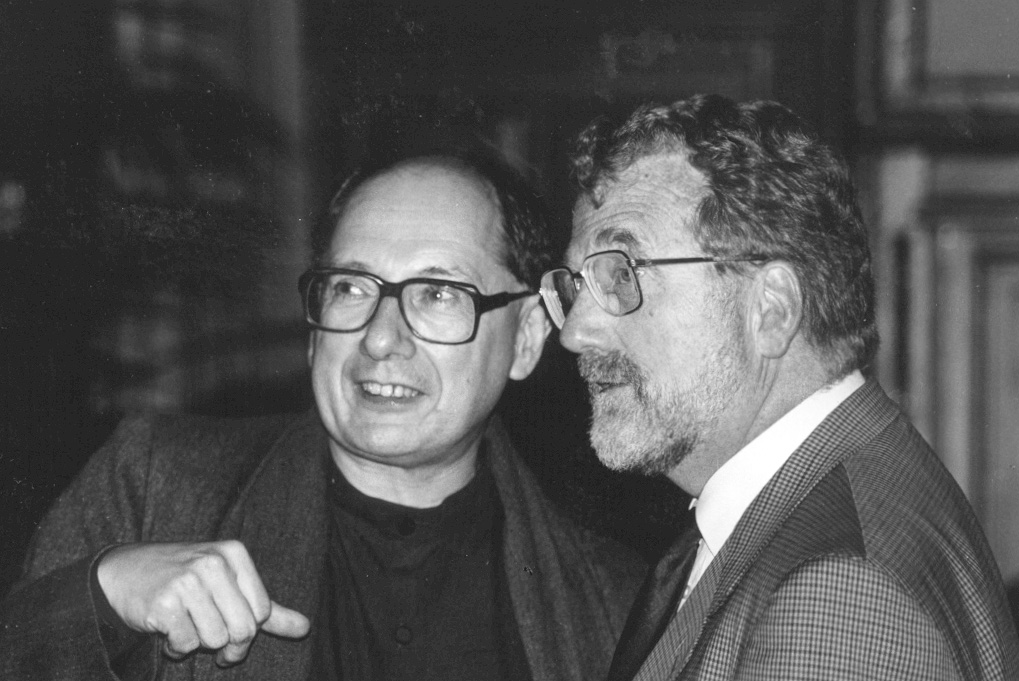
Marc Van Montagu (left) and Jozef Schell (right)

Plant Genetic Systems (PGS), since 2002 part of Bayer CropScience, is a biotech company located in Ghent, Belgium. The focus of its activities is the genetic engineering of plants. The company is best known for its work in the development of insect-resistant transgenic plants.

Its origin goes back to the work of Marc Van Montagu and Jeff Schell at the University of Ghent who were among the first to assemble a practical system for genetic engineering of plants. They developed a vector system for transferring foreign genes into the plant genome, by using the Ti plasmid of Agrobacterium tumefaciens. They also found a way to make plant cells resistant to the antibiotic kanamycin by transferring a bacterial neomycin phosphotransferase gene into the plant genome. PGS was the first company (in 1985) to develop genetically engineered (tobacco) plants with insect tolerance by expressing genes encoding for insecticidal proteins from Bacillus thuringiensis (Bt).

== History ==
The company was founded in 1982 by Marc Van Montagu and Jeff Schell who worked at the University of Ghent, Belgium. In 1996 the company was acquired by AgrEvo. In 2000, Aventis CropScience was formed through a merger of AgrEvo and Rhône-Poulenc Agro. In 1999, a trial of AgrEvo genetically modified maize was the target of a Greenpeace direct action near Lyng, Norfolk, and was involved in the subsequent trial of the activists.

In 2000 StarLink, a genetically modified maize developed by Plant Genetic Systems was detected in over 300 consumer food products in the US, triggering a recall. StarLink had not been approved for human consumption by the FDA. Following the recalls, PGS at first tried to get the application for human consumption approved, and then withdrew the product entirely from the market.

In 2002, Bayer CropScience was formed through Bayer's acquisition of the plant biotech branch Aventis CropScience.

== See also ==
- CropDesign
- Flanders Interuniversity Institute of Biotechnology (VIB)
- Marc Zabeau
