= Hunstanton Park Esker =

Protected area in Norfolk, England

Coordinates: 52.939°N 0.521°E

- Site of Special Scientific Interest
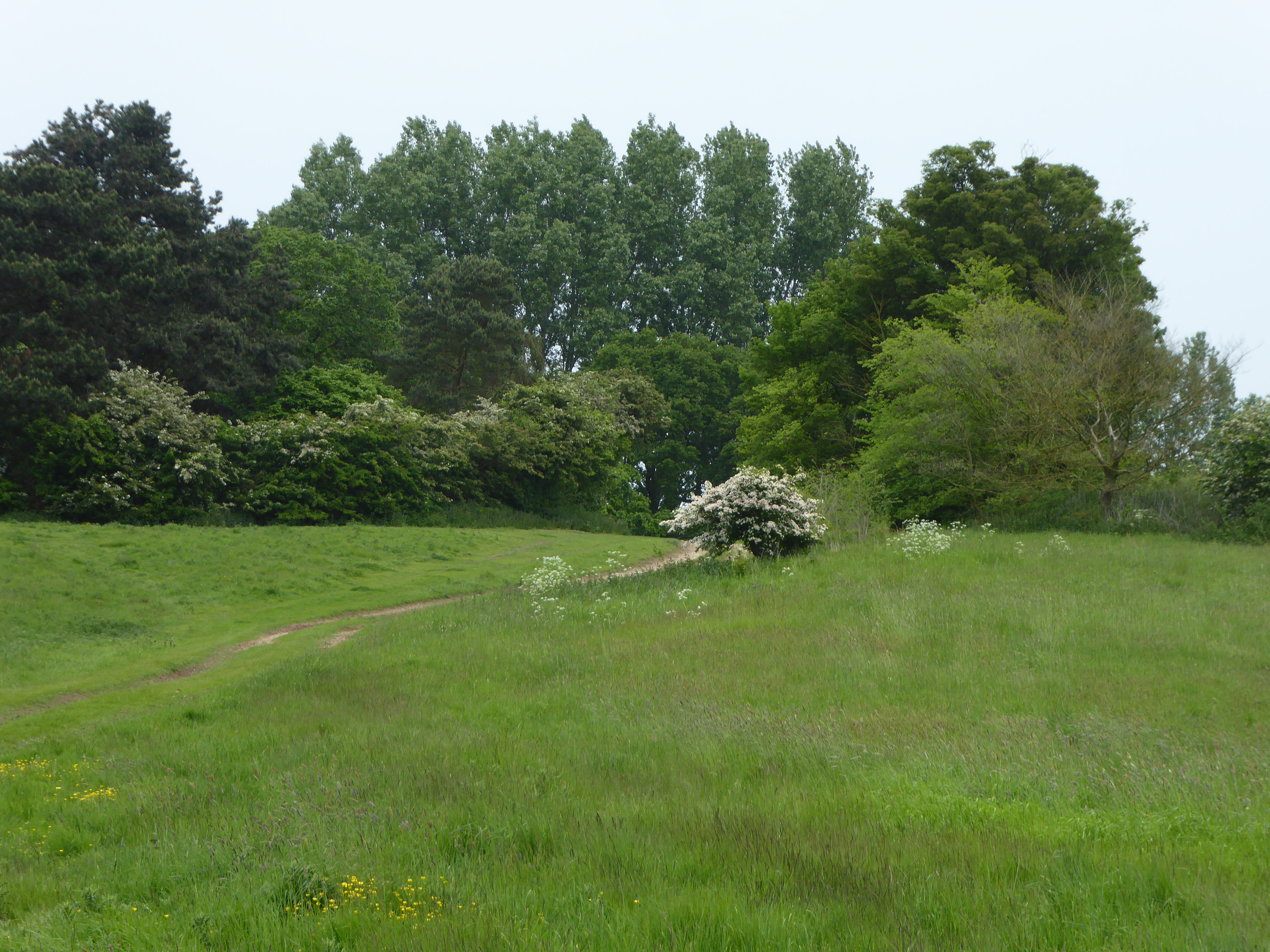
- Location of Hunstanton Park Esker.
- Area of search: Norfolk, England
- Grid reference: TF 695 409
- Interest: Geological
- Area: 17.3 hectares (43 acres)
- Notification date: 1990
- Location map: Magic Map

Hunstanton Park Esker is a 17.3-hectare (43-acre) geological Site of Special Scientific Interest east of Hunstanton in Norfolk, England. The esker extends 1.5 km from north of Ringstead Downs to Hunstanton Hall. It is a Geological Conservation Review site.

This is a 1.5-kilometre (1-mile) esker, a long winding ridge of stratified sand and gravel dating to the glacial Devensian period, between 115,000 and 11,700 years ago. This is an uncommon landform in central and southern England.

It is private land and there is no public access.
