= Felix Hope-Nicholson =

British aristocrat and genealogist

- Born: Charles Felix Otho Victor Gabriel John Adrian Hope-Nicholson; 21 July 1921
- Died: 15 September 1990 (aged 69)
- Education: Eton College; Christ Church, Oxford
- Occupations: Aristocrat and genealogist
- Father: Hedley Hope-Nicholson

Charles Felix Otho Victor Gabriel John Adrian Hope-Nicholson (21 July 1921 – 15 September 1990) was a British aristocrat and genealogist. The Herald of Scotland called him a "tall, imposing figure known as the Squire of Chelsea", and noted that after Eton College, Christ Church, Oxford, and the war he had "dedicated his life to the greater glory of his ancestors, in particular the Linlithgow family and the Hopes of Hopetoun House."

== Biography ==
The son of Hedley Hope-Nicholson, a barrister, head of the Society of King Charles the Martyr and heir to a raincoat fortune, in his young years Felix Hope-Nicholson was a notable figure in high society in London, and was often seen socialising at The Ritz. During an air raid during World War II, in a drunken state, he tripped and fell on King Zog of Albania, who was staying at the hotel at the time. By the 1970s he was described as "impoverished", but successfully kept up the appearance of a "bachelor dandy". He lived in the house in which he was raised, More House, 52 Tite Street. Hope-Nicholson was a friend of Francis Bacon and Hamish Erskine (son of the 5th Earl of Rosslyn), a "notoriously vain, rather silly and extremely amusing" homosexual, unofficially ('listlessly') engaged to Nancy Mitford until Erskine ended the relationship.
