= Ringstead Windmill =

Windmill in Ringstead, Norfolk, England

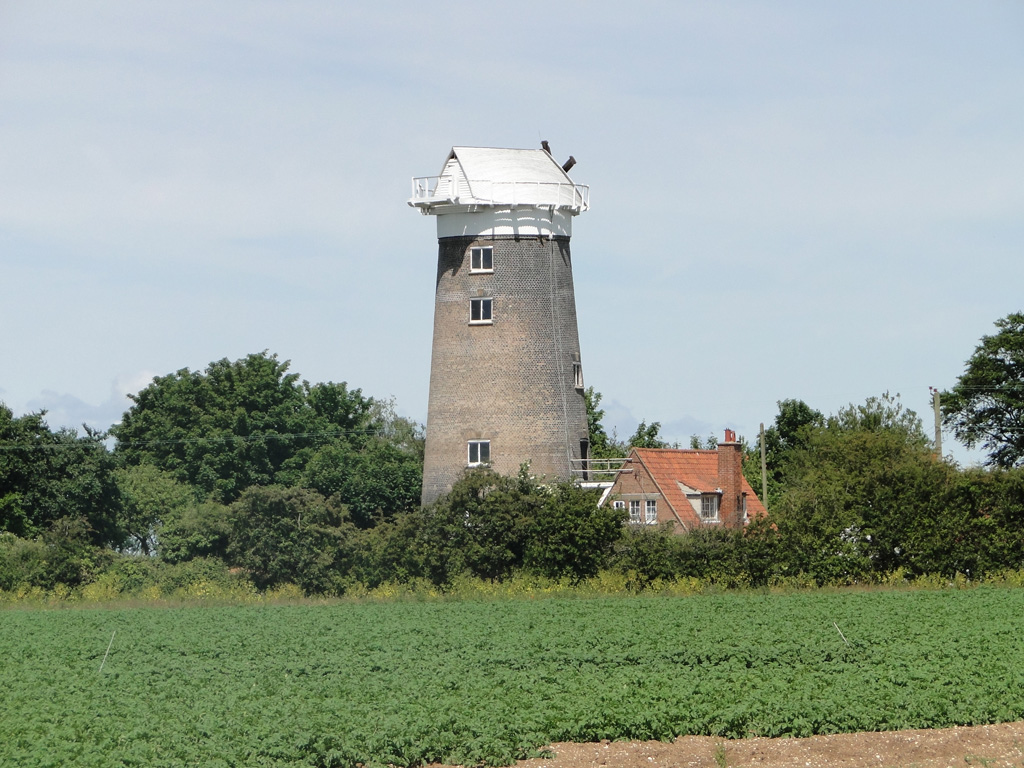
- Ringstead Windmill, June 2015
- Interactive map of Ringstead Windmill

Origin
- Mill name: Ringstead Windmill
- Mill location: Ringstead, Norfolk, United Kingdom
- Grid reference: TF 7056 4161
- Coordinates: 52°52′41″N 0°31′13″E
- Year built: 1840s

Information
- Purpose: Corn Mill
- Type: Tower mill
- Storeys: Six storeys
- No. of sails: Six
- Type of sails: Patent sails
- Windshaft: Cast iron
- Winding: Fantail
- No. of pairs of millstones: Three pairs
- Size of millstones: One pair is 4 feet 0 inches (1.22 m) diameter

Ringstead Windmill is a Grade II listed six-sailed tower mill at Ringstead, Norfolk, United Kingdom. Built in the 1840s, it worked until 1892. The derelict mill was converted to residential use in 1927, retaining most of its machinery.

== History ==
There were a pair of post mills in Ringstead, one of which was standing in 1710. A second had been added by 1780, both of which were owned by Giles Thurlow. The mills stood north and south of each other, a few yards apart. Thurlow died in 1800 and both mills were offered for sale by auction. In 1801, Matthew Green and Samuel Herring took out fire insurance on the mills with the Royal Exchange Assurance Corporation. Green held the northern mill, which was in the ownership of Mr. Pickerell in 1828. Herring held the southern mill. It was offered for sale by auction in 1834, but did not sell. The mill was auctioned in 1836 and was offered for sale in 1837. Both mills were in the ownership of Henry L'Estrange Styleman Le Strange in 1842. Robert Goodman was the miller at the northern mill and William Norgate was the miller at the southern mill. The southern mill had been replaced by a six-sailed tower mill by 1845. The southern post mill was moved, initially to Beacon Hill, Thornham, Norfolk. In 1863, it was moved within Thornham and rebuilt as a composite mill. The northern mill was offered to let in 1859. Both mills were standing in 1863. John Crane was the miller from 1863 to 1890, followed by his son John, who worked the mill until 1892.

A 1920 painting by J. P. Chaplin shows that the mill had become derelict. Its sails were in ruins and the mill had lost its fantail. In 1927, it was bought by Prof. Cornford, who had it converted to residential accommodation. The architect was Hugh C. Hughes, who had converted Burnham Overy Staithe Windmill to a holiday home the previous year. At the time of conversion, the mill still had its boat shape cap. This was later replaced by a corrugated asbestos construction. A bungalow was later erected against the tower. Arthur C. Smith surveyed the mill on 6 April 1970 and again on 16 May 1981. He described the mill as having the shed-like roof, retaining the windshaft and some machinery. The mill was listed Grade II on 12 December 1982. The asbestos cap was replaced c. 2009 by a boat shaped cap.

== Description ==
Ringstead Windmill is a six-storey tower mill. It has a boat shape cap with a petticoat. Six single patent sails were carried on a cast iron windshaft, which had a cross. The windshaft is 12 inches (300 mm) diameter at the brake wheel, and 7 inches (180 mm) at the tail bearing. The mill was winded by a six-blade fantail. The break wheel is 9 feet 0 inches (2.74 m) diameter, and is of clasp arm construction. A wooden 16 inches (410 mm) diameter upright shaft carries a wooden wallower at the top. The upright shaft is in two sections, with an iron joint below the dust floor. A wooden great spur wheel is of clasp arm construction. Three pairs of French Burr millstones were driven overdrift. One pair of 4 feet 0 inches (1.22 m) diameter millstones survives. The machinery was all of oak.
