= Hedley Hope-Nicholson =

- Born: William Hedley Kenelm Nicholson; 17 July 1888; Bowdon, Cheshire, England
- Died: 18 July 1969 (aged 81)
- Education: University of Oxford
- Occupation: Barrister
- Spouse: Jaqueline Louise Rachel Hope
- Children: 3, including Felix Hope-Nicholson
- Relatives: Jean Hugo (son-in-law)

Hedley Hope-Nicholson (born William Hedley Kenelm Nicholson; 17 July 1888 – 18 July 1969), barrister and littérateur, was, with his wife Jaqueline, notable in English artistic and literary circles in the first half of the twentieth century.

== Early life and education ==
(William) Hedley Kenelm Nicholson was born at Bowdon, Cheshire, son of Alfred John Nicholson (1858-1928), a woollen merchant and coat manufacturer (Nicholson's Raincoats, of St Albans, Hertfordshire) from a family of Manchester tailors, and his wife Mary (1856-1926), daughter of currier Thomas Cleghorn, of Bildeston, Suffolk. His twin brother, Sigismund John Nicholson, died aged two. The family later lived at St Albans. Nicholson was educated at the University of Oxford.

== Career ==
A barrister of the Inner Temple, and heir to his father's "raincoat fortune", Hope-Nicholson counted among various eccentric hobbies a keen interest in King Charles I and was editor of the quarterly magazine of the Society of King Charles the Martyr. He kept a relic from the King's coffin and a piece of the shirt he wore on the scaffold in a box in the consecrated chapel in their London family home, More House, 34, Tite Street, Chelsea, formerly home of Oscar Wilde. His other great passion was for the Russian ballet. He was the author of The Mindes Delight: or Variety of Memorable Matters Worthy of Observation (1928). Hope-Nicholson had joined the Norfolk Regiment as a private in 1916, but applied for discharge on medical grounds for lung trouble, and was discharged having been assessed as unlikely to make a good soldier.

== Personal life ==
In 1916, Nicholson married Jaqueline Louise Rachel (1889-1972), daughter of Adrian Charles Francis Hope, descended from the Earls of Hopetoun, subsequently changing his surname to Hope-Nicholson by deed-poll. Jaqueline Hope-Nicholson was a genealogist, heraldic artist and impassioned costumier dealing with vast outdoor pageants and innumerable amateur theatricals but her greatest interest was in the Stuart kings, primarily Charles II. They separated amicably in 1937.

Their children were the artist Mary Lauretta Jaqueline Carola Desirée Valentine Esmé ('Lauretta', 1919–2005) who married the artist Jean Hugo in 1949 and worked as an assistant editor on the Burlington Magazine and with Richard Buckle on his publication 'Ballet'; Marie-Jaqueline Albertine Dorothea Beatrice Alexina Romaine Adriana (9 August 1922 – 17 May 2010; married in 1945 war correspondent (Herbert) Maurice Lancaster and had two daughters), who compiled Brian Howard: Portrait of a Failure in 1968, about Brian Howard; and (Charles) Felix Otho Victor Gabriel John Adrian (1921–1990), genealogist and antiquarian.

== Couplet ==
According to the art historian and writer Bevis Hillier, John Betjeman wrote a libellous couplet about Hope-Nicholson and his (at the time unusual for a man) habit of using make-up:

H is for Hedley, who lives in a Place.

What he makes on his bottom, he spends on his face.

However, James Lees-Milne, in his Diaries, gave a different account and version of the poem: "John Betjeman quotes the following couplet composed by the Widow Lloyd about Hedley Hope-Nicholson, that painted- but delightful- old queen:

H is for Hedley, the pride of Old Place,

What he earned from his bottom he spent on his face.
