= Anji Hunter, Baroness Hunter of Auchenreoch =

British political consultant

The Right Honourable The Baroness Hunter of Auchenreoch
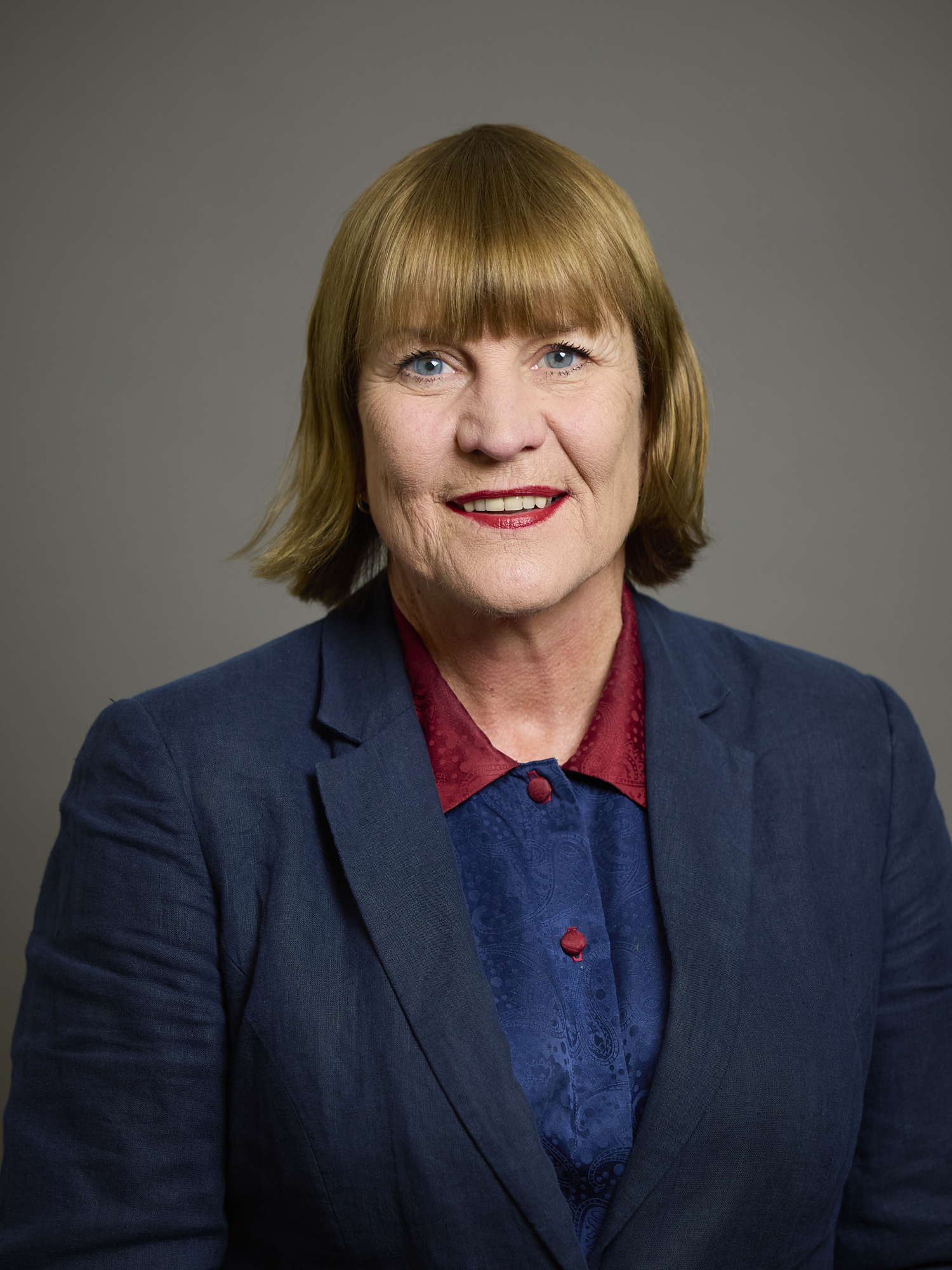
- Official portrait, 2025

Member of the House of Lords
- Lord Temporal
- Life peerage 5 February 2025

Personal details
- Born: Angela Margaret Jane Hunter; 29 July 1955 (age 71) Kuala Lumpur, Federation of Malaya
- Party: Labour
- Spouses: Nick Cornwall (m. 1980; div. 2004); Adam Boulton (m. 2006)
- Education: University of Brighton
- Occupation: Public relations adviser

Angela Margaret Jane Hunter, Baroness Hunter of Auchenreoch (born 29 July 1955), is a Scottish public relations adviser and Labour life peer. She is noted for her close partnership with former Prime Minister Tony Blair.

== Early life ==
Hunter was born in Kuala Lumpur, Malaysia. Her father, Arthur Hunter, was a rubber plantation manager, appointed MBE for his service with the Special Operations Executive in Burma during the Second World War.

Hunter was privately educated at St Leonards School in St Andrews, Scotland, and St. Clare's, Oxford, sixth form college. She first met Tony Blair while still in Scotland, at the age of 15.

She has a first in history and English from the University of Brighton.

== Career ==
After graduating in 1987, Hunter began working for Tony Blair, by then an MP, as his political assistant. She became Director of Government Relations for Blair's government in 1997, and was described as "the most influential non-elected person in Downing Street". Of her role and contribution to the New Labour administration, Blair wrote in his memoir: "You underestimated her at your peril. She had perhaps the most naturally intuitive political instinct of anyone I ever met, was very, very clever, and could be ruthless beyond any of us, if she felt it necessary to protect me or the project." In his biography of Blair, Anthony Seldon argued "Hunter's greatest service to Blair was to help him to grow into the role, first of aspirant leader, then party leader, then Prime Minister. There is no higher service a friend can offer than to help one to become independent."

In 2001, Hunter left Downing Street to become Director of Communications at the oil and gas company BP in 2002. In 2009, she was appointed Director of External Affairs for Anglo American plc. She is a board member of the Snowdon Trust, founded by the Earl of Snowdon, which provides grants and scholarships for students with disabilities. She is the founding Director and now a Trustee of the Queen Elizabeth Prize for Engineering and serves on the Board of the Birmingham Business School. She is a member of the Commonwealth Observers Group.

In 2013, Hunter joined the international public relations and marketing consultancy Edelman as a senior adviser, where she helps promote senior women in business.

In December 2024, it was announced that Hunter had been nominated for a peerage and would be joining the House of Lords as a Labour life peer as part of the 2024 Political Peerages. She was created Baroness Hunter of Auchenreoch, of Edzell in the County of Angus on 5 February 2025.

== Personal life ==
Hunter married the landscape gardener Nick Cornwall in 1980. The couple had two children. In July 2002, it was reported that Hunter was in a relationship with the political editor of Sky News Adam Boulton. Hunter and Boulton both divorced their spouses, and married in 2006.
