= Fuller baronets of Neston Park (1910) =

Fuller baronets
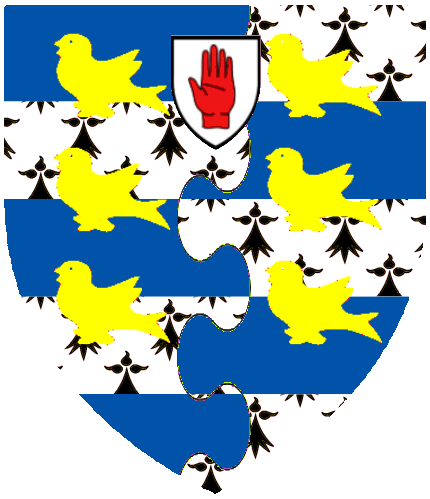
- Escutcheon of the Fuller baronets of Neston Park
- Creation date: 1910
- Status: extant
- Motto: Deo Duce Confido (I trust in God as leader)
- Arms: Per pale nebuly Azure and Ermine two bars counterchanged over all six martlets two two and two Or.
- Crest: Issuant from a coronet flory Or a lion's head per pale Azure and Ermine.
- Supporters: On the dexter a lion reguardant Proper and on the sinister a wolf reguardant Argent each gorged with a collar Or pendent therefrom an escutcheon per pale nebuly Azure and Or charged with six martlets counterchanged.

The Fuller baronetcy, of Neston Park in Corsham, in the County of Wiltshire, was created in the Baronetage of the United Kingdom on 7 July 1910 for John Fuller. He represented Westbury in the House of Commons from 1900 to 1911 and served as Governor of Victoria from 1911 to 1914.

== Fuller baronets, of Neston Park (1910) ==
- Sir John Michael Fleetwood Fuller, 1st Baronet (1864–1915)
- Sir (John) Gerard Henry Fleetwood Fuller, 2nd Baronet (1906–1981), born 8 July 1906, son of 1st Baronet and Norah Jacintha Phipps, daughter of Charles Nicholas Paul Phipps of Chalcot House, near Westbury, Wiltshire; served Life Guards, 1927 to 1946; Second World War (mentioned in despatches); Justice of the Peace for Wiltshire, 1946; Member of Wiltshire County Council, 1947–1971 (alderman, 1961); Joint Master, Avon Vale Fox Hounds, 1947–1961 and 1962–1964. Married 1931, Lady Fiona Pratt, daughter of 4th Marquess Camden GCVO (divorced 1944), two sons; secondly, 1945, Kathleen Elizabeth MBE DStJ (died 1964), daughter of Sir George Farrar, Bt; and thirdly, 1966, Mrs Mary Leventon; he died 16 October 1981.
- Sir John William Fleetwood Fuller, 3rd Baronet (1936–1998)
- Sir James Henry Fleetwood Fuller, 4th Baronet (born 1970)

The heir apparent is the present holder's son Archie Mungo Fleetwood Fuller (born 2001).

== Notes ==
Baronetage of the United Kingdom
Preceded by Ewart baronets	Fuller baronets of Neston Park; 7 July 1910	Succeeded by Mond baronets
