= Henry Ewart =

British Army officer and courtier (1838–1928)

Major-General Sir Henry Ewart Bt GCVO KCB
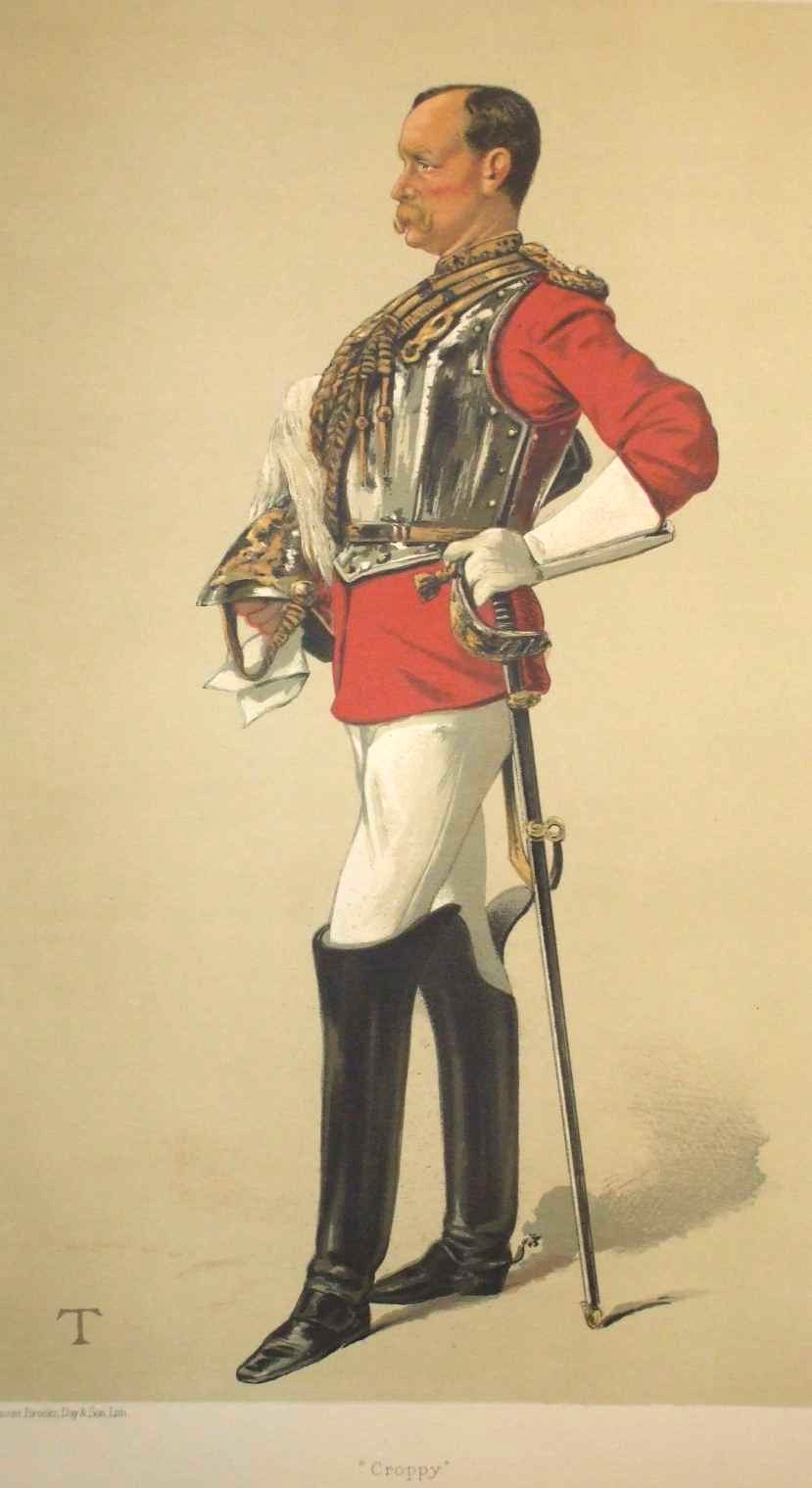
- Henry Ewart in Vanity Fair, 1881, captioned "Croppy"
- Born: 20 August 1838
- Died: April 1928 (aged 89)
- Military career
- Allegiance: United Kingdom
- Branch: British Army
- Service years: 1858–1892
- Rank: Major-General
- Unit: Household Cavalry
- Commands: 2nd Life Guards; Household Cavalry Composite Regiment
- Conflicts: Anglo-Egyptian War; Mahdist War
- Awards: Knight Grand Cross of the Royal Victorian Order; Knight Commander of the Order of the Bath

Major-General Sir Henry Peter Ewart, 1st Baronet, GCVO, KCB (20 August 1838 – April 1928) was a British Army officer and courtier.

== Life ==
He was the son of the Rev. Peter Ewart of Kirklington and his wife Mary Salisbury. He was educated at Eton College, and matriculated at Merton College, Oxford in 1856.

Ewart purchased his commission in the 2nd Life Guards in 1858 at the age of 20. By 1882 he was commanding officer of his regiment, and was chosen to command the Household Cavalry Composite Regiment on its deployment to Egypt during the Anglo-Egyptian War. It was during this conflict that he led the 'Moonlight Charge' of the Household Cavalry at Kassassin on 28 August 1882. He was appointed a Companion of the Order of the Bath (CB) in November 1882. Ewart subsequently commanded the Cavalry Brigade of the British Suakin Expeditionary Force during the Mahdist War between 1884 and 1885. In 1885 he was promoted to Knight Commander of the Order of the Bath (KCB).

Between 1884 and 1894 Ewart served as Crown Equerry to Queen Victoria, and was subsequently Crown Equerry to Edward VII from 1901 to 1910. In 1897 he was appointed a Knight Commander of the Royal Victorian Order (KCVO). On 10 February 1900 he was made Colonel of the 7th Dragoon Guards and served as such until he was appointed joint Colonel of the 4th/7th Royal Dragoon Guards in 1922 and served until his death in 1928.

After successfully taking part in the arrangement for the coronation of King Edward VII on 9 August 1902, he was promoted to Knight Grand Cross of the Royal Victorian Order (GCVO) on 11 August 1902. Following the King′s death in May 1910, he was created a baronet, of White House in the parish of Hythe in the County of Southampton, on 14 June 1910.

== Family ==
Ewart married Hon. Evelyn Clementina Heathcote-Drummond-Willoughby, daughter of Gilbert Heathcote-Drummond-Willoughby, 1st Earl of Ancaster, at Lowndes Square on 3 November 1888. Together they had one son, Victor Alexander Ewart, who served as an officer in the Royal Navy and was killed on HMS Queen Mary during the Battle of Jutland in 1916.

Baronetage of the United Kingdom
New creation	Baronet (); 1910–1928	Extinct
Preceded by Roberts baronets	Ewart baronets of White House; 14 June 1910	Succeeded by Fuller baronets
Military offices
Preceded by Andrew Nugent	Colonel of the 7th Dragoon Guards; 1900–1922	Amalgamated; 4th/7th Royal Dragoon Guards
New creation	Colonel of the 4th/7th Royal Dragoon Guards; 1922–1928	Succeeded by Arthur Solly-Flood
