= St Edmund's Chapel, Lyng =

UK religious ruins

St Edmund's Chapel
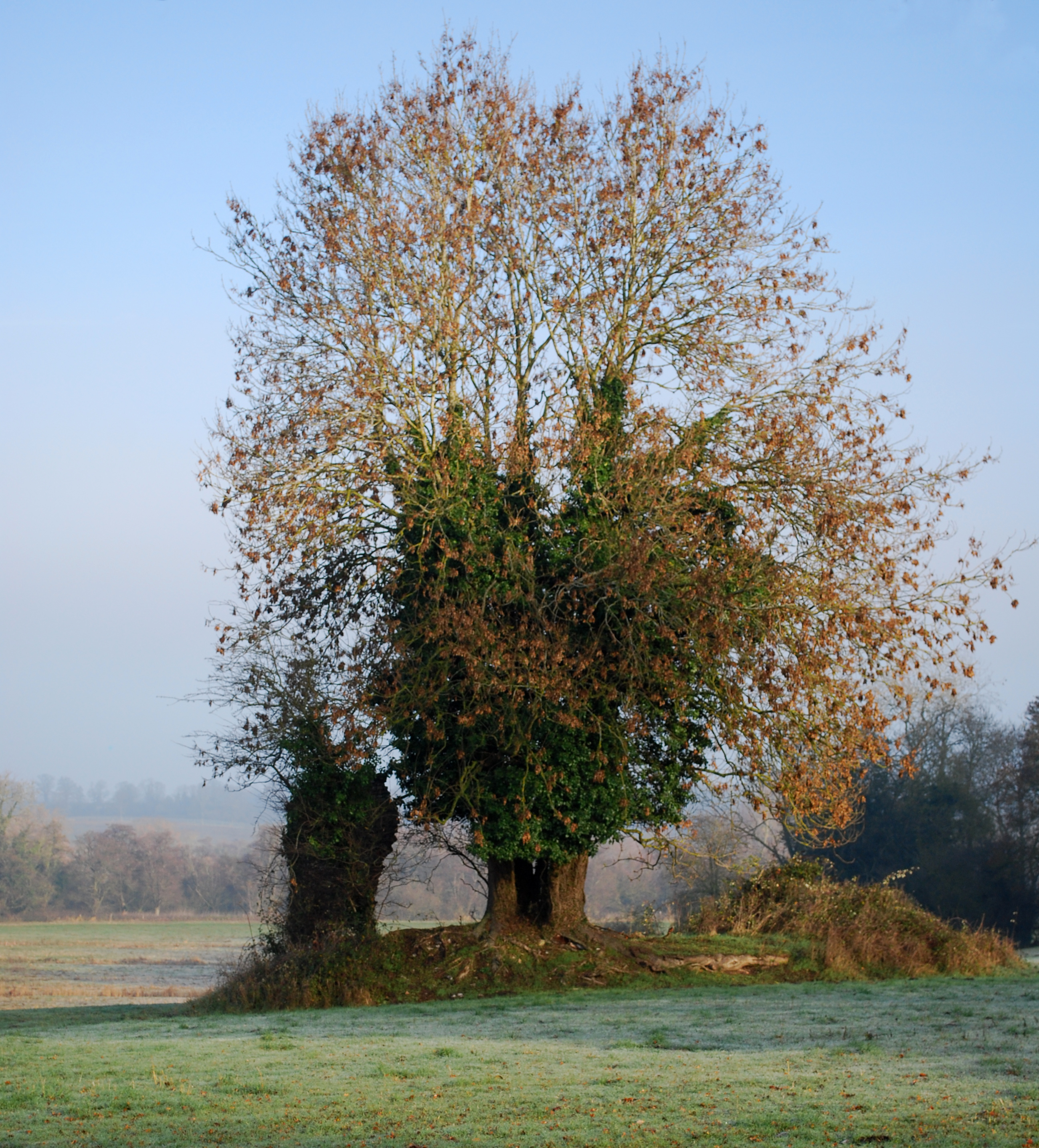
- The fragmentary ruins of the chapel

Religion
- Affiliation: Christianity
- Status: Ruin

Location
- Location: Lyng, Norfolk
- Country: UK
- Interactive map of St Edmund's Chapel
- Coordinates: 52.7135°N 1.0764°E

The ruins of St Edmund's Chapel are located in a field to the east of the village of Lyng in the English county of Norfolk. It was one of two religious buildings in Lyng, the other being St Margaret's Church.

== History ==
There is evidence of mid-to-late Saxon activity on the site of the chapel, including pottery sherds, fasteners and a prick spur, though the chapel was built later than this.

The chapel was part of a Benedictine nunnery, purportedly founded to commemorate and pray for a battle with the Danes during their 9th century campaign, which would end with the death of Edmund the Martyr. Edmund's body was purportedly entrusted to this nunnery, where it was prepared for burial, according to the writings of monk Abbo of Fleury in circa 985. Abbo claimed that a woman named Olwen cut Edmund's hair and nails there, which he said had continued to grow after his death. According to other

The nunnery was transferred to Thetford in 1176. The chapel was not abandoned until at least 1250, and a fair was held on the site by the Prioress of St George's Priory, Thetford in 1287. The nuns retained a messuage and 90 acres (36 ha) of land at Lyng, paying for a chaplain to service the chapel from the profits. A lawsuit is recorded in 1438 between the prioress and the rector of Lyng, after which date the land was transferred to the village church.

There is a reference to the chapel in the Bodleian MS 240. This dates from the 1370s, when in the space of five years there were seven miracles connected with the chapel. These mostly involved incidents in the surrounding villages, such as Bylaugh, Scarning and Sparham, but one involved a man from Kent whose wife was cured of paralysis.

The chapel was in ruins by 1730. The brickwork in the remaining ruins is probably fifteenth century in date, and it is possible that the site remained in use until the Reformation, possibly as a chapel of ease for the hamlet of Lyng Eastaugh to the east. The ruins of the chapel which remain are described as "fragmentary" although Nikolaus Pevsner recorded a surviving arch during the 1950s, possibly the north doorway. Only part of the arch remains, and the ruins are largely obscured by vegetation. Objects ranging from Roman to post-medieval in date have been found on the site. During the 19th century human skeletons were found between the chapel and the road to the south. There was also a guild of St Edmund in the village.

== In folklore ==
When the nuns left Lyng in the twelfth century, they retained the income derived from holding the annual fair on 20 November (St Edmund's day). This fair long outlived the nunnery; it survived into the last quarter of the nineteenth century and is mentioned in Parson Woodforde's diary.

A newspaper article from 1939 records a tradition concerning the chapel. It was said that it was founded for the nuns to pray for the souls of those killed in a battle between the Danes and King Edmund's Anglo-Saxons, which may have occurred near to the site of the chapel.

=== Great Stone of Lyng ===
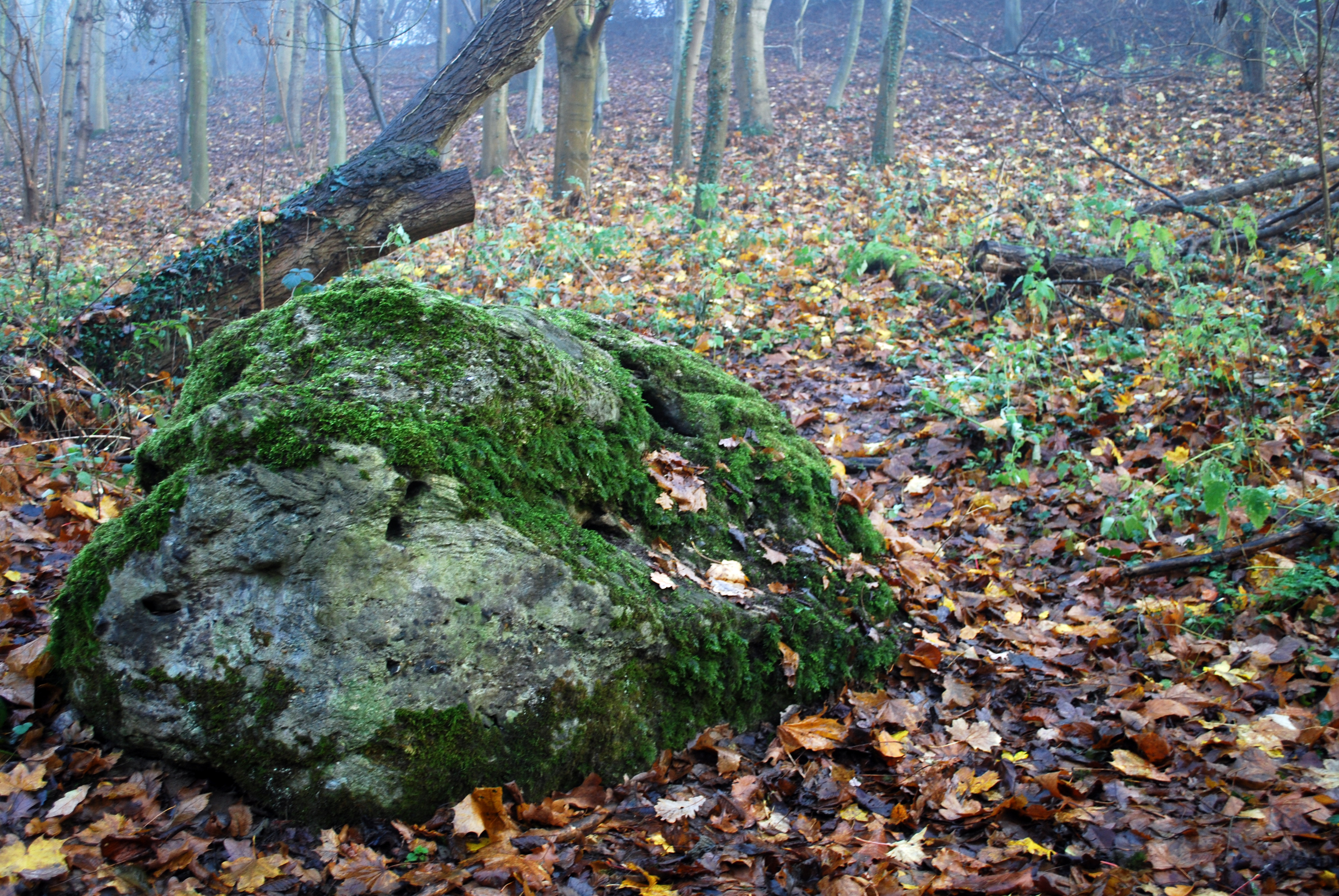
The Great Stone of Lyng

The Great Stone of Lyng is a glacial erratic boulder of conglomerate stone which is about 2 metres long by 1.5 metres wide. It was originally situated on open, sloping ground. It now sits next to a wooded track, an "ancient" hollow way in the Grove, which is an area of woodland to the south of the chapel that appeared on maps from the 18th century as King's Grove. The hollow way runs through the wood, connecting the hamlet of Collen's Green to the road.

First referred to as the Great Stone in circa 1730 or 1750 by Thetford antiquarian Tom Martin, It has been associated in folklore with "druids, devils, sounds, the stone moving or growing, burials and treasure" as well as the stone bleeding "if pricked with a pin". Attempts to remove the stone to reveal purported treasure beneath have failed. Its folklore is partially associated with that of the nunnery; people have claimed it to be the Druids' Stone and the grove to be visited by phantom nuns, with the blood that was thought to come out of the stone being that of sacrificial victims. Other versions of its folklore state that the blood was shed in the battle between the Danes and St Edmund.

== Sources ==
- Brooks, Pamela, n.d.: Norfolk Ghosts and Legends ISBN 978-1-84114-747-5
