= Ringstead, Norfolk =

Village in Norfolk, England

Coordinates: 52.933°N 0.53853°E

Ringstead
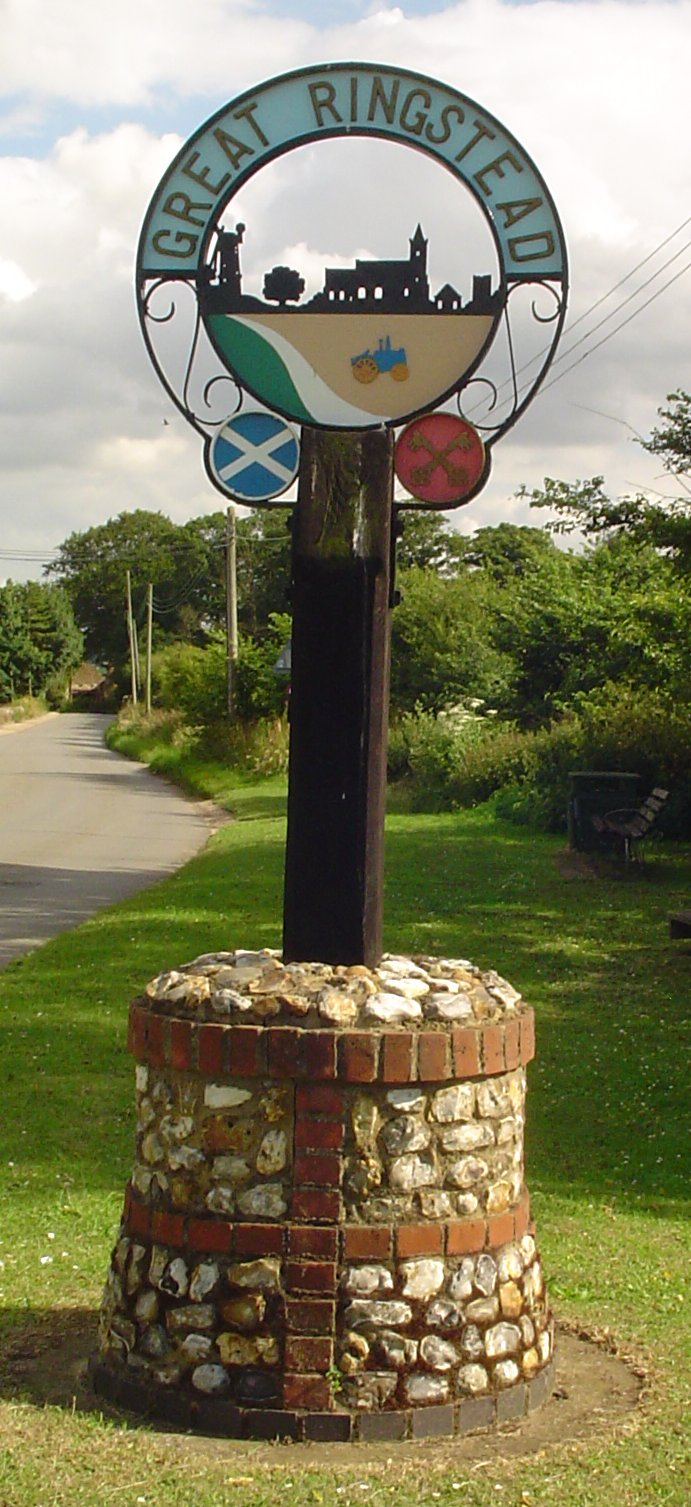
- Signpost in Ringstead

- Location within Norfolk
- Area: 11.13 km^{2} (4.30 sq mi)
- Population: 324 (2011)
  - Density: 29/km^{2} (75/sq mi)
- OS grid reference: TF707403
- Civil parish: Ringstead
- District: King's Lynn and West Norfolk
- Shire county: Norfolk
- Region: East
- Country: England
- Sovereign state: United Kingdom
- Post town: HUNSTANTON
- Postcode district: PE36
- Police: Norfolk
- Fire: Norfolk
- Ambulance: East of England

Ringstead is a village and civil parish in the north-west corner of the English county Norfolk. It covers an area of 11.13 km^{2} (4.30 sq mi) and had a population of 355 in 155 households at the 2001 census, reducing to 324 at the 2011 census. For the purposes of local government, it falls within King's Lynn and West Norfolk district.

== Name ==
The village's name means 'ring place', perhaps referring to a stone circle or circular/round topographical feature.

The village is referred to as Ringstead by the Ordnance Survey. The longer form of the name is Great Ringstead, which is preferred by the parish council. Historically, this was to distinguish the village from the neighbouring deserted medieval village of Barrett Ringstead, also known as Little Ringstead or Rinstead Parva. This was just to the west, and is now in the parish of Old Hunstanton.

== Churches ==
The village had two parishes in the Middle Ages, which were consolidated in 1771 and so one church was abandoned. The surviving church is dedicated to St Andrew and has a 13th-century tower, 14th-century nave and 15th-century chancel. There was a major restoration in 1865, which involved the partial rebuilding of the tower and chancel east wall, as well as the addition of a south aisle and porch.

The other church was dedicated to St Peter. Apart from its late 11th-century round tower, it was demolished in 1772 but the tower survives in a private garden at the end of Hall Lane, near Ringstead Bury House.

The lost village of Little Ringstead had a church dedicated to St Andrew, which survives as a roofless ruin in an arable field to the west of Downs Farm. The remains have a rectangular plan, are 13th century and might comprise the chancel of a larger church. The village was depopulated by plague in 1349, but the church continued as a private chapel until it was converted into a barn in the 17th century. The ruined Chapel of St Andrew is Grade II* listed.

== Notable buildings ==
Apart from the two churches, Ringstead has fourteen other listed buildings. These comprise the farmhouses at Bluestone, East End and Geddings Farms; the War Memorial; the Gin Trap Inn (the 17th-century village pub), the village windmill, the Ringstead Gallery, 22–26 High Street and residences called Old Rectory, Ringstead Bury House, Ringstead Bury Stables, Rose Cottage, The Lodge and The White House.

== Downs ==
The Ringstead Downs comprise a partly wooded chalk ridge to the south-west of the village, and is important for it unimproved chalk grassland. A permissive footpath runs through it and links Ringstead to the nearby resort town of Hunstanton.

== Transport ==
The village is isolated. Although country lanes radiate to neighbouring villages, there is no A or B road, no direct route to the nearest town of Hunstanton and no public transport.

There has been no bus service since the shutdown of the Stagecoach in Norfolk bus company in 2018. Before this, the village was on the route 31 from Fakenham to Hunstanton, allowing for connections to Norwich at the former place and King's Lynn at the latter.

== Notable residents ==
- Julian Mond, 3rd Baron Melchett (9 January 1925 – 15 June 1973) – former chairman of British Steel Corporation
- Sonia Mond, Sonia Melchett, Baroness Melchett – (6 September 1928; socialite and author
- Peter Mond, 4th Baron Melchett – (28 February 1948– 28 August 2018) former Lord in Waiting, Parliamentary Under-Secretary of State and Minister of State

== Notes ==
http://kepn.nottingham.ac.uk/map/place/Norfolk/Ringstead
