= Marc Zabeau =

Belgian scientist and businessman (born c. 1949)

Marc Zabeau (born 1949, Lier, Belgium) is a Belgian scientist and businessman.

== Biography ==
Marc Zabeau graduated in 1971 as a licentiate in zoology at the University of Ghent and obtained a PhD in 1974, studying the genetics of Escherichia coli in the lab of Jeff Schell.

In 1976, on an NFWO scholarship as a Fulbright Hayes postdoctoral fellow, he went for two years to the Cold Spring Harbor Laboratory in New York, the United States. From 1978 until 1983 he worked at the European Molecular Biology Laboratory in Heidelberg, Germany. during his stay in Heidelberg, he was appointed as professor of genetic engineering at the Vrije Universiteit Brussel.

In 1983, he became director of research of Plant Genetic Systems in Ghent, Belgium and in 1986 director of intellectual property and business development. He founded several biotech companies, such as Helix C.V. (Ghent, 1988), KeyGene N.V. (Wageningen, 1989), GenScope Inc. (United States, 1995) and Methexis (Ghent, 1997). In 1999, he succeeded Marc Van Montagu as scientific director of the Department of Plant Systems Biology at the Flanders Institute for Biotechnology (VIB). In 2002, he was succeeded by Dirk Inzé. In 1999, he was appointed as full-time professor of genome biology and functional genomics at the University of Ghent.

Zabeau was formerly CEO of Trinean.

He is currently managing partner of Qbic Venture Partners.

== Selected publications ==
- Mahillon J, Seurinck J, Delcour J, Zabeau M., Cloning and nucleotide sequence of different iso-IS231 elements and their structural association with the Tn4430 transposon in Bacillus thuringiensis, Gene. 1987;51(2–3):187–96.
- Vuylsteke M, van Eeuwijk F, Van Hummelen P, Kuiper M, Zabeau M., Genetic analysis of variation in gene expression in Arabidopsis thaliana, Genetics. 2005 Nov;171(3):1267–75.
- Zabeau M, Stanley KK., Enhanced expression of cro-beta-galactosidase fusion proteins under the control of the PR promoter of bacteriophage lambda, EMBO J. 1982;1(10):1217–24.

== Sources ==
- Marc Zabeau (in Dutch)
- Marc Zabeau (PDF)
