= St Margaret's Church, Lyng =

Church in Norfolk, England

St Margaret's Church
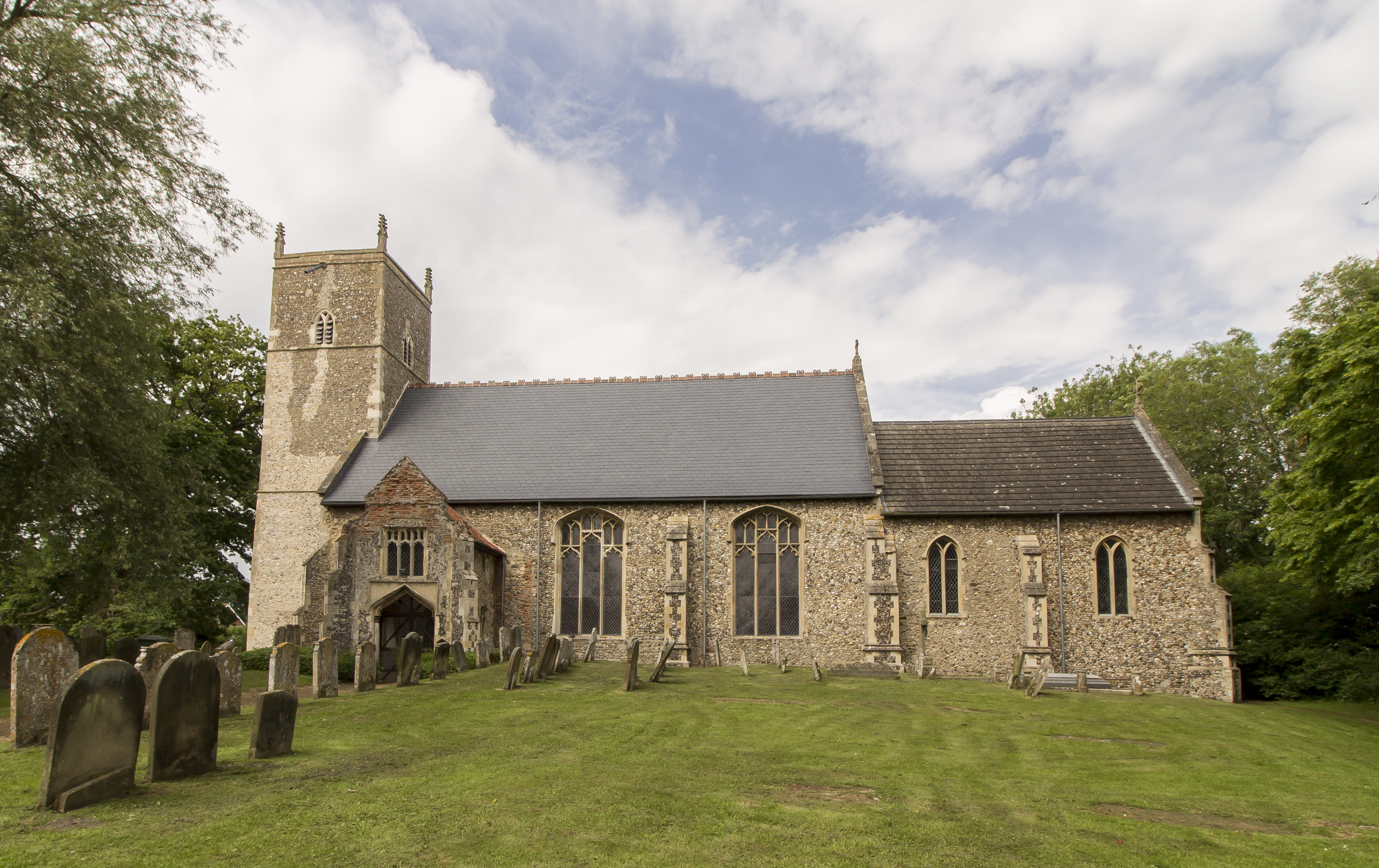
- The front of the church, on its south side

Religion
- Affiliation: Christianity

Location
- Location: Lyng, Norfolk
- Country: UK
- Interactive map of St Margaret's Church
- Coordinates: 52.7188°N 1.06206°E

St Margaret's Church is a Grade II* listed parish church in Lyng, Norfolk. It is one of two churches that existed in the parish, the other being St Edmund's Chapel which is now a ruin. St Margaret's is a Grade II listed building.

== Architecture ==
St Margaret's is a medieval church built from flint, ashlar and brick. Its architecture consists of a 13th-century west tower, a wide 15th century nave with large windows and a hammerbeam roof, a south porch built in the 15th century, formerly two storeys high and with an 18th-century Dutch gable with a large pediment and dentil cornice, and a chancel which was rebuilt in 1912. There are decorated 15th century south doors and inside is an early 13th-century octagonal font, a stained glass depiction of St Margaret in the east window and a 15th-century altar cloth made up of parts of vestments. Archaeological monitoring of the 2012 excavation of a cable trench in identified the 15th century foundations of a buttress and a possible crypt to the west of the 13th-century tower.
