= Baron Melchett =

Title in the Peerage of the United Kingdom

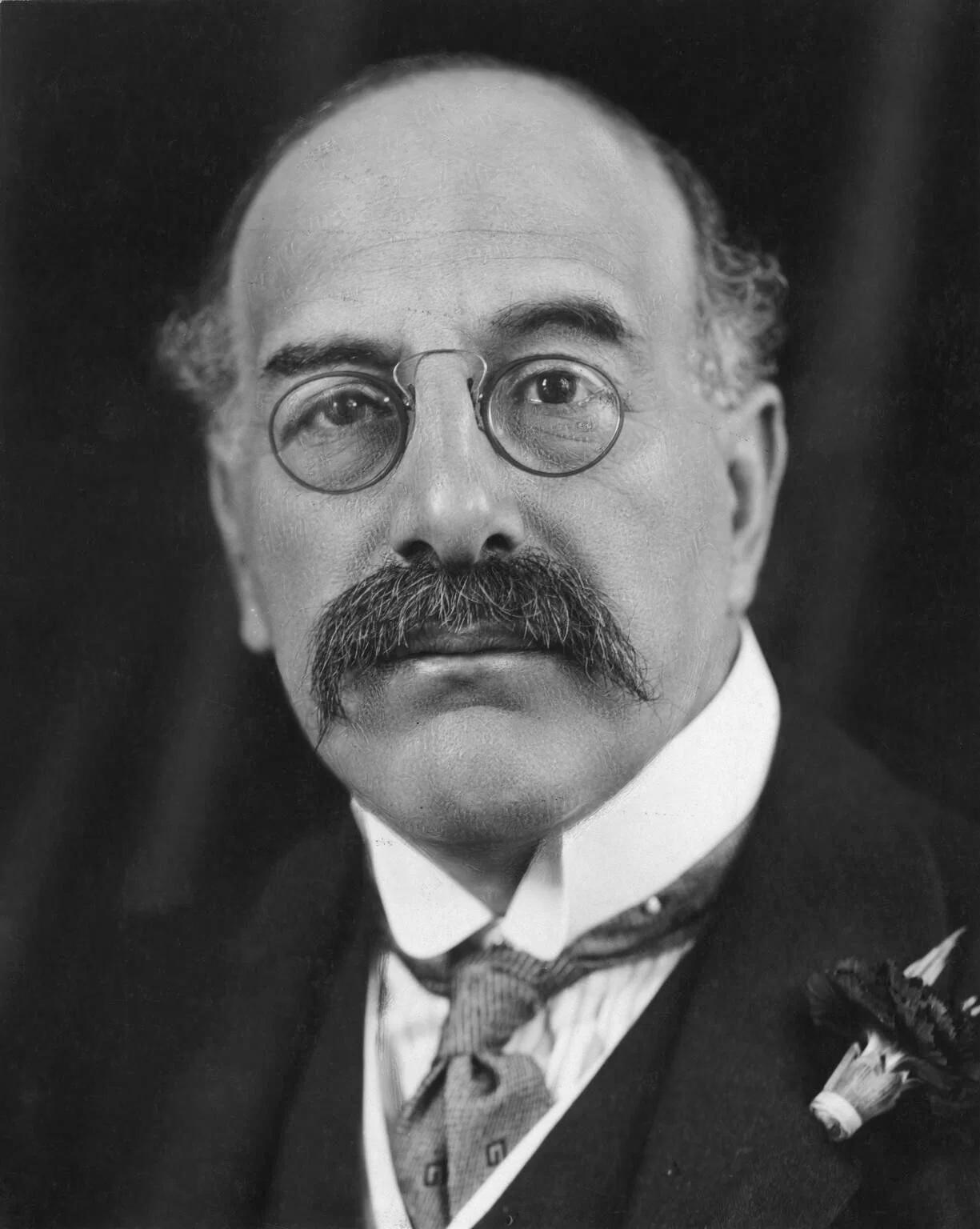
Alfred Mond, 1st Baron Melchett

Baron Melchett, of Landford in the County of Southampton, was a title in the Peerage of the United Kingdom. It was created on 5 June 1928 for Sir Alfred Mond, 1st Baronet, Chairman of Imperial Chemical Industries and a former First Commissioner of Works and Minister of Health. He had already been created a Baronet, of Hartford Hill in Great Budworth in the County of Chester, on 8 July 1910.

Mond was succeeded by his only son, the second Baron. He was also a politician and businessman. His second but only surviving son, the third Baron, was a businessman. The latter's son, the fourth Baron, succeeded in 1973. He held political office under James Callaghan in the late 1970s and was later Executive Director of Greenpeace UK.

Ludwig Mond, father of the first Baron, was an industrialist.

== Barons Melchett (1928) ==
- Alfred Moritz Mond, 1st Baron Melchett (1868–1930)
- Henry Ludwig Mond, 2nd Baron Melchett (1898–1949)
- Julian Edward Alfred Mond, 3rd Baron Melchett (1925–1973)
- Peter Robert Henry Mond, 4th Baron Melchett (1948–2018)

The barony and baronetcy became extinct on the death of the 4th Baron in 2018 because his only son was illegitimate, and under peerage law could not succeed to his father's titles. According to Desert Island Discs broadcast on BBC Radio on 4 February 2000, Lord Melchett intentionally had his son out of wedlock because he was against the inheritance of privilege.

== Coat of arms ==
Coat of arms of the Barons Melchett
Notes Coat of arms of the Mond family Coronet A coronet of a Baron Crest A Demi-Bear holding between the paws a Fountain both proper. Escutcheon Quarterly: 1st and 4th, Gules a Demi-Lion rampant argent between in chief a Decrescent and an Increscent and in base a Crescent all Or on a Chief Argent an Eagle displayed between two Mullets Sable (Mond); 2nd and 3rd, Azure on a Pile between three Mullets Argent an Eagle displayed Sable (Lowenthal). Supporters Dexter: a Doctor of Science of the University of Oxford holding in the exterior hand a Chemical Measure Glass; Sinister: a Labourer holding in the exterior hand a Pick resting on the shoulder, all proper. Motto Make Yourself Necessary

Baronetage of the United Kingdom
Preceded by Fuller baronets	Mond baronets of Hartford Hill; 8 July 1910	Succeeded by Warner baronets
