= Boulton & Co =

Former afternoon television news programme, broadcast on Sky News

- Presented by: Adam Boulton; Sarah Hewson
- Country of origin: United Kingdom

Production
- Running time: 1 hour

Original release
- Network: Sky News
- Release: 17 January 2011 – 1 August 2014

Boulton & Co is a British news programme airing between 1 p.m. and 2 p.m. on weekdays on Sky News.

It was presented by the channel's political editor, Adam Boulton who gave up his Sunday morning show to take on the weekday commitment, and Sarah Hewson, Sky's former Royal correspondent. Sarah-Jane Mee and Jayne Secker acted as relief second presenter.

Unlike other programmes on Sky News which are broadcast from their main studios, Boulton & Co came from Sky's Westminster studio. The programme featured interviews, breaking news stories and hard hitting debates. Although its focus was primarily on UK events, the show was aired internationally. It was launched on Monday 17 January 2011.

The show ended on Friday 1 August 2014 with Adam Boulton and Sarah Hewson moving to host a new evening show, Sky News Tonight, from September 2014.

Day	Presenter One	Presenter Two
Monday-Friday	Adam Boulton	Sarah Hewson
