= Lyng, Norfolk =

Coordinates: 52°43′09″N 01°03′36″E

Lyng
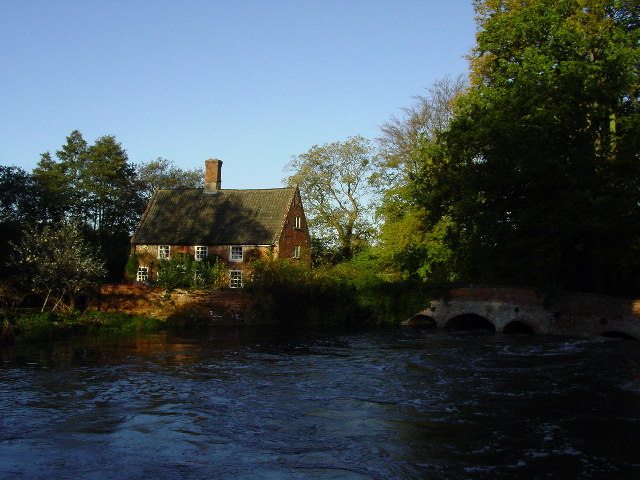
- The Mill House on the River Wensum at Lyng

- Location within Norfolk
- Area: 7.99 km^{2} (3.08 sq mi)
- Population: 860 (2021)
  - Density: 108/km^{2} (280/sq mi)
- OS grid reference: TG 068 176
- District: Breckland
- Shire county: Norfolk
- Region: East
- Country: England
- Sovereign state: United Kingdom
- Post town: NORWICH
- Postcode district: NR9
- Dialling code: 01603
- Police: Norfolk
- Fire: Norfolk
- Ambulance: East of England
- UK Parliament: Mid Norfolk

Lyng is a village and civil parish in the English county of Norfolk. It is situated on the River Wensum, some 10 km (6.2 mi) north-east of the town of East Dereham and 20 km (12 mi) north-west of the city of Norwich.

The civil parish has an area of 7.99 km^{2} (3.08 sq mi) and in the 2021 census had a population of 860 people in 360 separate households (in the 2011 census had a population of 807 in 356 households). For the purposes of local government, the parish falls within the Elmham and Mattishall division of Norfolk County Council and the Upper Wensum ward of Breckland District Council.

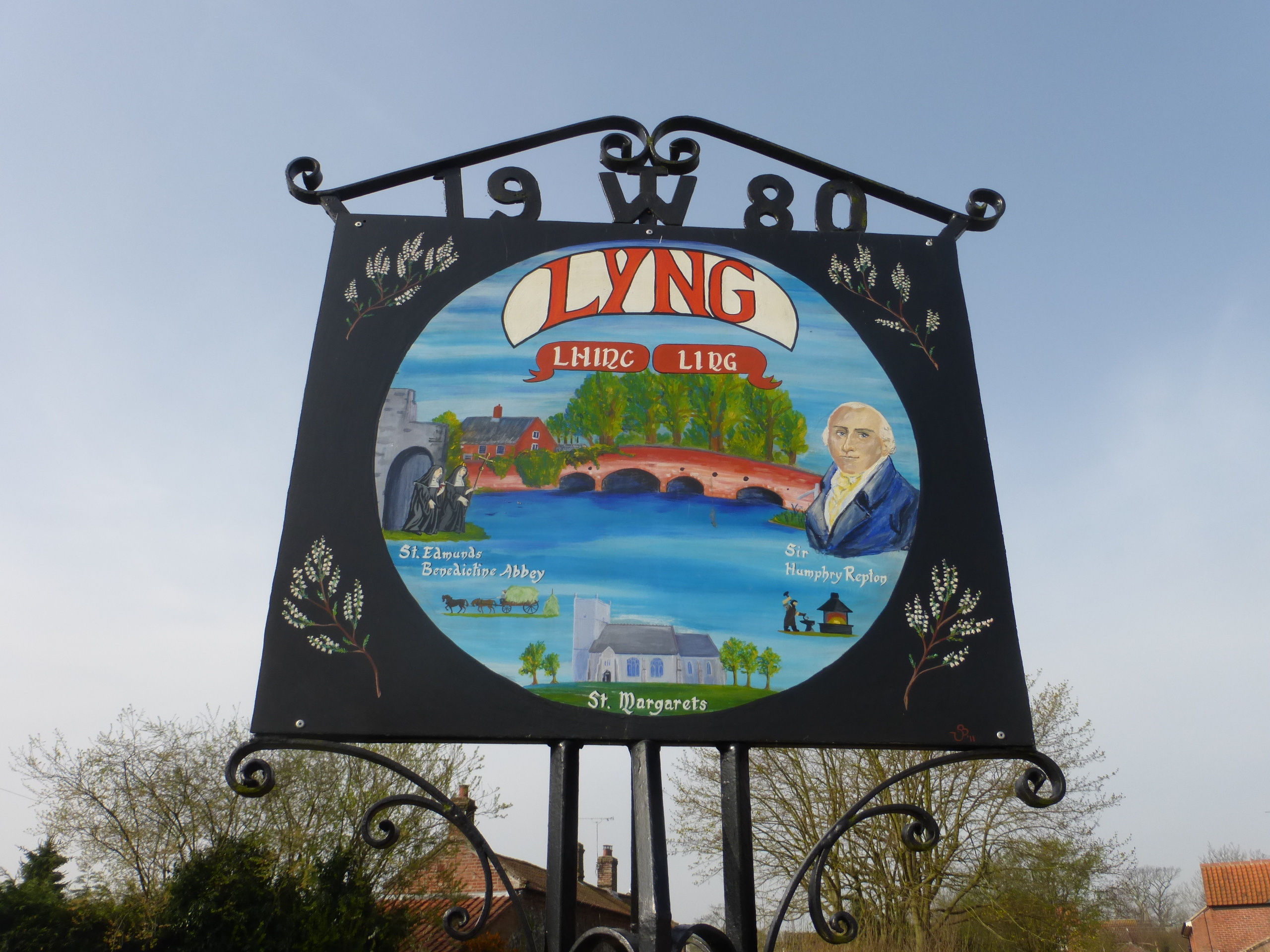
Lyng village sign

== History ==
The village's name is likely derived from the Old English word 'hlinc', meaning 'bank', 'ledge', or 'terrace', possibly deriving from a river terrace.

Human activity in the Lyng area dates back to the Paleolithic period, with two flint handaxes from the period found in a gravel pit there in the 1960s. In 1916, archaeologists observed a probable Mesolithic flint working site. Evidence of activity in the Early Bronze Age has been found, but there is currently no sign of Iron Age activity in the area.

There is significant evidence of a Roman presence in the area, including a pottery kiln in the east of the parish as well as coins, pottery fragments, brooches, and a copper alloy votive hammer. Saxon finds are also present, including a rare Middle Saxon spur and a Late Saxon brooch.

== Churches ==
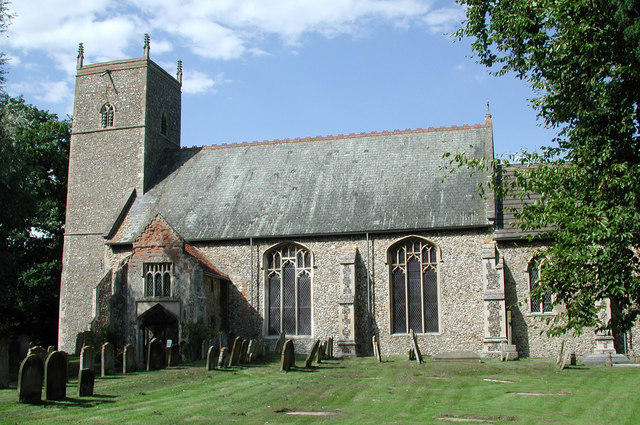
St Margaret's Church

In medieval times, Lyng had two churches. St Edmund's Chapel was the church of a Benedictine nunnery at Lyng Eastaugh, three quarters of a mile to the south-east of the village. It fell into ruin after being abandoned in the 13th century and all but a small stone pillar has disappeared.

St Margaret's Church is the oldest surviving building in the parish, from the medieval period. It is still in use today and has regular services operated by the Church Of England. Externally, the church appears to be 17th to 18th century, due to a large renovation that took place around that time. The nave dates from the 15th century, when it was most probably enlarged from the original medieval church which stood there. Lyng St Margaret also houses an altar cloth which was made in the 19th century from at least two 15th-century vestments.

Clergyman and poet Ralph Knevet became rector of Lyng in 1652, and remained there for the rest of his life. He died in 1671 and was buried in the chancel of St Margaret's. Charles Anson was another rector of Lyng from 1794.

== Other features ==
Lyng also has a motocross track located to the south of the village called Cadders Hill, run by the Norwich Vikings motorcycle club. The club holds the British Motocross Championship, Eastern Centre Championship, and other events annually. The track is situated in a natural valley with Cadders Hill and the surrounding woodland as its main feature.

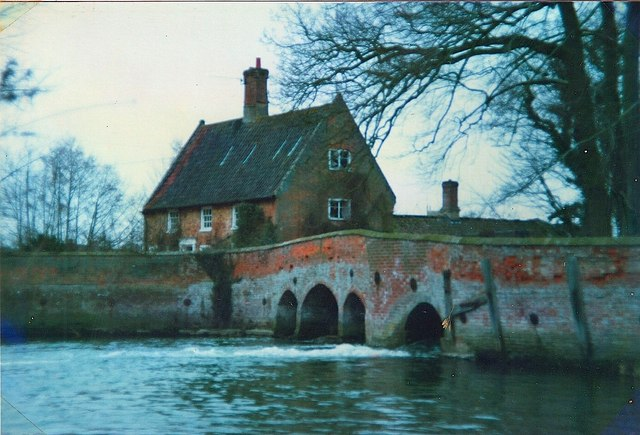
The mill house in 1987

Lyng had a mill house on the River Wensum originally built for milling flour, which later operated for both paper and flour. It burned down, but was rebuilt in 1778. The village developed a long-standing family economy of papermaking from the mill, in which wives and daughters prepared discarded linen for pulping. During the Swing Riots in 1830, when it was identified that the newly erected rag "chopping machines" that were used to make paper at the mill had disrupted this economy, Luddites armed with "axes, hammers, bars and bludgeons" attacked the machines in 1832 and destroyed the building. The mill was rebuilt and used until 1865, but still remains next to a three-arched bridge over the Wensum river, and both are Grade II listed buildings.

Multiple post-medieval kilns are present in Lyng, including multiple lime kilns in existence since at least 1836, and one of which was a brick kiln that was turned up by ploughing in 1977.

A World War II type 22 concrete pillbox built in 1940 still exists to the south of Lyng Easthaugh, possibly used alongside gun emplacements or a searchlight battery.

Like many villages in Norfolk, Lyng is surrounded by farmland. On 26 July 1999, Greenpeace activists, led by Lord Melchett, destroyed 6 acres of genetically modified maize at Walnut Tree Farm in Lyng as a form of civil disobedience. The protest created national headlines. Melchett was refused bail, but he and the other 27 activist co-defendants were acquitted of theft and criminal damage the next year.

== Eastaugh ==
The hamlet of Eastaugh or Easthaugh (pronounced "Eastlee"), often known as Lyng Easthaugh, lies to the south-east of the main village near Weston Longville. It is the site of the ruin of the medieval chapel of St Edmund's.
