= Ringstead Downs =

Protected area in Norfolk, England

Coordinates: 52.931°N 0.514°E

- Site of Special Scientific Interest
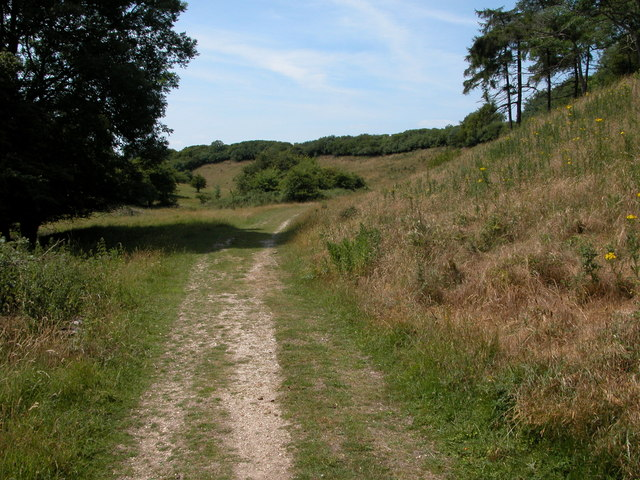
- Location of Ringstead Downs.
- Area of search: Norfolk
- Grid reference: TF 691 400
- Interest: Biological
- Area: 6.9 hectares (17 acres)
- Notification date: 1986
- Location map: Magic Map

Ringstead Downs is a 6.9-hectare (17-acre) biological Site of Special Scientific Interest east of Hunstanton in Norfolk, England. It is in the Norfolk Coast Area of Outstanding Natural Beauty, and it is the western part of the 11-hectare (27-acre) Ringstead Downs nature reserve, which is managed by the Norfolk Wildlife Trust.

It is a dry chalk valley which was carved out by glacial meltwaters. It is species-rich as it has never been ploughed, and it is the largest surviving area of chalk downland surviving in the county. The butterflies are diverse.

A footpath between Ringstead and Downs Road in Hunstanton goes through the reserve.
