= Julian Mond, 3rd Baron Melchett =

English industrialist (1925–1973)

Julian Edward Alfred Mond, 3rd Baron Melchett (9 January 1925 – 15 June 1973) was an English industrialist.

== Early life ==
Julian Mond was the younger son of Henry Mond, 2nd Baron Melchett and Gwen Wilson. He was educated at Eton and rather than going to university joined the Fleet Air Arm in 1942. Here he served in the Atlantic and on the Russian convoys. His elder brother, Lieutenant The Honourable Derek John Henry Mond, was serving on HMS Philante when he was killed in a flying accident near Lochalsh on 30 April 1945. Thus on their father's death in 1949, Julian succeeded as 3rd Baron Melchett of Landford in the County of Southampton and 3rd Baronet of Hartford Hill in Great Budworth in the County of Chester.

== Business career ==
After leaving the armed forces, Melchett joined Air Contractors Ltd, a subsidiary of the merchant bank M. Samuel & Co. A year later in 1948, supported by the bank, he founded a farming company based in Norfolk, British Field Products Limited, which specialised in grass-drying and animal feedstuffs. Melchett soon afterwards joined the merchant bankers M. Samuel & Co. This company merged with Philip Hill, Higginson and Erlanger Ltd to form Hill Samuel & Co. Limited and Melchett became director in charge of the banking and overseas departments. He was also a director of the Guardian Assurance Company and of the Anglo-American Shipping Co Ltd. He was an adviser to the British Transport Docks Board, a member of the council of administration of the Malta Dockyard and on the councils of the Confederation of British Industry and the National Economic Development Council.

In 1966, Harold Wilson asked him to be chairman of a committee to plan the nationalization of the British steel industry, and from that time until his death he was effectively the chairman of what became the British Steel Corporation. This was formed from fourteen major iron and steel companies and other smaller ones who together employed more than a quarter of a million workers.

== Personal and family ==
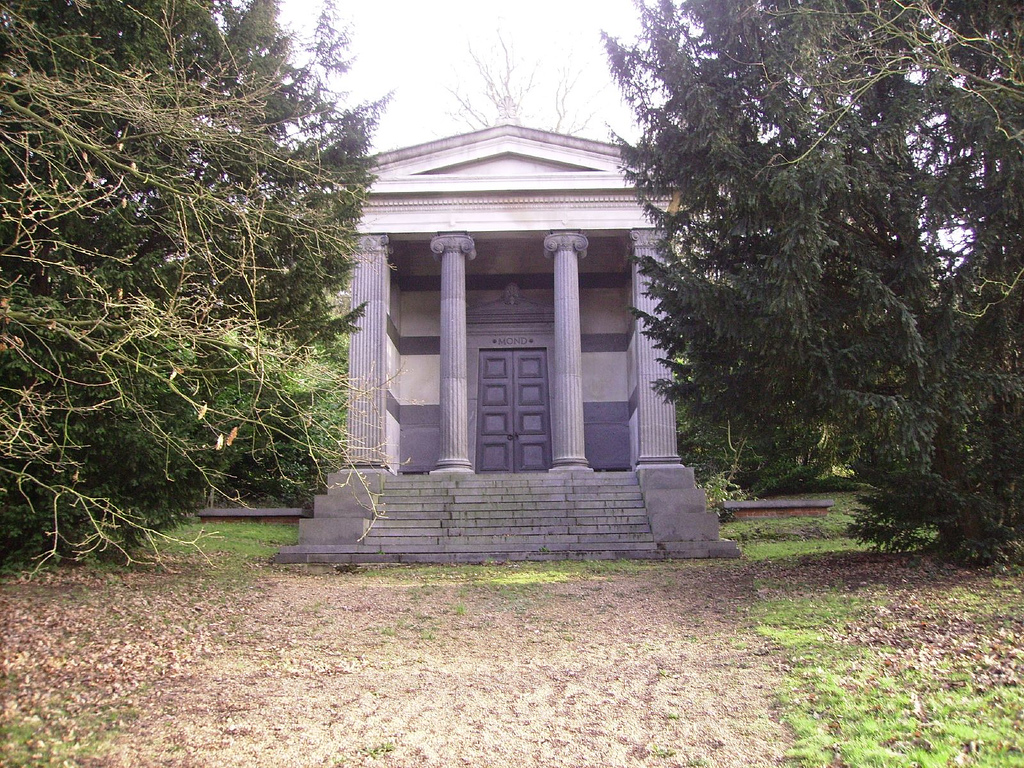
The Mond mausoleum

Melchett married Sonia Elizabeth Graham in 1947. They had one son, Peter Robert Henry Mond, and two daughters, The Honourable Kerena Ann Mond and The Honourable Pandora Shelley Mond. For most of their married life they lived on Tite Street in Chelsea, and on a farm, Courtyard, at Ringstead in Norfolk. They built a villa, Casa Melchett, near Cap de Formentor in Mallorca and used to go for family holidays there. Lord Melchett died while on holiday there in June 1973 and was buried in the family mausoleum in St Pancras cemetery, Finchley. A memorial service was held for him in Westminster Abbey. His estate was valued at slightly over £310,000.

== Coat of arms ==
Coat of arms of Julian Mond, 3rd Baron Melchett
Notes Coat of arms of the Mond family Coronet A coronet of a Baron Crest A Demi-Bear holding between the paws a Fountain both proper. Escutcheon Quarterly: 1st and 4th, Gules a Demi-Lion rampant argent between in chief a Decrescent and an Increscent and in base a Crescent all Or on a Chief Argent an Eagle displayed between two Mullets Sable (Mond); 2nd and 3rd, Azure on a Pile between three Mullets Argent an Eagle displayed Sable (Lowenthal). Supporters Dexter: a Doctor of Science of the University of Oxford holding in the exterior hand a Chemical Measure Glass; Sinister: a Labourer holding in the exterior hand a Pick resting on the shoulder, all proper. Motto Make Yourself Necessary

== See also ==
- Ludwig Mond Award
- Melchett Medal
- Mond gas
- Brunner Mond & Co.

== Notes ==
Peerage of the United Kingdom
Preceded by Henry Mond	Baron Melchett; 1949–1973	Succeeded by Peter Mond
