= Peter Mond, 4th Baron Melchett =

English farmer, jurist, and politician

The Right Honourable The Lord Melchett
- On acquittal in 2000

Under-Secretary of State, Industry
- In office 4 December 1975 – 10 September 1976
- Monarch: Elizabeth II
- Prime Minister: James Callaghan
- Preceded by: Gerald Kaufman
- Succeeded by: Neil Carmichael

Minister of State for Northern Ireland
- In office 10 September 1976 – 4 May 1979
- Monarch: Elizabeth II
- Prime Minister: James Callaghan
- Preceded by: Don Concannon

Personal details
- Born: Peter Robert Henry Mond; 24 February 1948 London, England
- Died: 29 August 2018 (aged 70)
- Party: Labour
- Domestic partner: Cassandra Wedd
- Children: 2
- Parent(s): Julian Mond, 3rd Baron Melchett; Sonia Melchett
- Education: Eton
- Alma mater: Pembroke College, Cambridge
- Occupation: Executive, farmer, politician
- Known for: Environmental activism at the Ramblers' Association, Greenpeace and Soil Association

Peter Robert Henry Mond, 4th Baron Melchett (24 February 1948 – 29 August 2018), also known as Peter Melchett, was an English farmer, jurist and politician. He succeeded to the title of Baron Melchett in 1973.

== Early life ==
The son of the British Steel Corporation chairman Sir Julian Mond (later the 3rd Baron Melchett) and writer Sonia Melchett (now Sinclair), and great-grandson of Imperial Chemical Industries founder Sir Alfred Mond, 1st Baron Melchett, Mond grew up on his family's 890 acre Courtyard Farm at Ringstead, Norfolk. At the age of 13, he found two dead partridges, which he deduced to have been killed by the pesticides his father was using on the farm, and which began his environmental outlook on the world. He was educated at Eton and Pembroke College, Cambridge, where he read law, but never took his final exams due to a near-fatal disease of his colon. He went on to take an MA in criminology at Keele University, and later researched the sentencing of cannabis users at the London School of Economics and at the Institute of Psychiatry (1971–1973).

== Political career ==
Lord Melchett succeeded to his titles in 1973 at the age of 25, after his father died of a heart attack. He chose not to relinquish his privilege to enter the House of Lords as it would grant him leverage over the legalisation of cannabis and advocacy for squatters’ rights. Also following his father's death, he became the managing director of his father's Ringstead farm, which under his management became open to the public to roam over and farmed with consideration toward wildlife.

When Labour won re-election in October 1974, he was made a lord-in-waiting (House of Lords whip) by Harold Wilson, working in the Department of the Environment as a junior minister under Anthony Crosland. According to Wilson, he was the youngest government minister appointed at least in modern times, and he was promoted twice within two years. As well as departmental responsibilities, he took particularly controversial legislation through the House (including pension legislation and bills nationalising the aircraft and shipbuilding industries).

In 1976, he chaired a Government committee on music festivals, which at the time were controversial due to instances of violence, with some calling for the outright banning of free festivals. Through the committee, he oversaw a report that recommended "rock on taxpayers' expense", causing him to be nicknamed "Lord Pop". This legislation is credited by Michael Eavis as the basis upon which the Glastonbury Festival has continued to succeed.

In 1975, he was made a Parliamentary Under-Secretary of State in the Department of Industry, where he was responsible for small firms and workers' cooperatives. When James Callaghan succeeded Wilson as Labour leader and prime minister in 1976, Melchett moved to become Minister of State at the Northern Ireland Office. Melchett increased teacher numbers, improved provision for mental health care services, and saw Northern Ireland provided with funding for sporting facilities. He was responsible for legislation making it possible to set up nonsectarian schools.

In his book Minority Verdict – Experiences of a Catholic Public Servant, Maurice Hayes, Northern Irish civil servant, wrote about working with Melchett, stating that:

[He] did not have everything spelled out or interpreted for him. More important, he related to the young people around, he was mobile, accessible, and very attractive to large numbers of people. He also had a lot of courage and fought for issues that did not fall within his brief, which involved some aspect of human rights or discrimination or criminal justice.

— Maurice Hayes, Minority Verdict – Experiences of a Catholic Public Servant

One such issue was a case in which Melchett helped to secure a pardon for a young girl who had been convicted and imprisoned for killing her father, who had sexually abused and assaulted the girl's mother and turned his attention on her younger sister. In his book, Hayes also said:

Melchett chafed at the constraints that were put on him in the name of security or convention and on his ability to travel to any part of Northern Ireland. He went out as often as he could and on whatever pretext to what were regarded 'difficult areas' – generally places that no minister had ever visited before, or any representative of government more exalted or benign than a policeman or a summons server – and found the people always glad to see him.

In the late 1970s, Melchett was the first chair of a (short-lived) Legalise Cannabis Campaign. For over 30 years, he was a patron of Prisoners Abroad, a registered charity that supports British citizens who are imprisoned overseas.

After Margaret Thatcher won the 1979 election, Melchett served on the Opposition Front Bench in the House of Lords from 1979 to 1981, covering the environment and wildlife, and leading for the Opposition on the Wildlife and Countryside Bill, which became an Act in 1981. The bill faced around 1200 amendments at the Committee stage in the Lords, said to be more than any other Bill, many moved by Melchett. After amendments, the Act introduced proper protection for Sites of Special Scientific Interest and additional protection for numerous species, including bats and curlews, the latter of which was "one of his proudest achievements", insisted on by the Lords after initial protection introduced in the Lords was rejected by the Commons. After 1979, he became increasingly displeased with short-termism and toeing the party line under Labour in opposition, and left Westminster politics in 1981.

== Career after politics ==
Immediately after he resigned as minister in 1979, Melchett was appointed as the part-time chairman of the government's Community Industry initiative, a government funded scheme run by the National Association of Youth Clubs, which employed young people in particularly deprived areas in the UK. Melchett left Community Industry in 1986.

From 1979 to 1985, Melchett worked in a voluntary capacity for a number of wildlife groups, and for the Ramblers' Association as president from 1981 to 1984 and as vice president from 1984. Upon becoming president, he created new footpaths across Courtyard Farm for the public to use freely, but banned hunters and shooters. He also served for a spell on the Ramblers’ Council, which he claimed was his only elected office. In that period, he was also a Council member of the RSPB, and helped found and chaired (1980–1987) the national liaison body for wildlife and environment groups, Wildlife Link (now Wildlife and Countryside Link), which brought together around 30 NGOs, including Friends of the Earth and Greenpeace, which had been excluded from previous liaison arrangements. He was a trustee of WWF UK from 1977 to 1984 and an advisor to Friends of the Earth and the RSPCA.

Melchett was also Chair of the Board of Greenpeace Japan, which became the third largest and most influential environmental organisation in Japan, securing a number of significant changes in Government policy and corporate behaviour.

He was a Special Lecturer at the School of Biological Sciences at the University of Nottingham from 1984 to 2002.

In 1985, he took part in peaceful Campaign for Nuclear Disarmament protest at the Sculthorpe US nuclear air force base, organised by the Snowball movement. Along with many other protesters, he and his partner, Cassandra Wedd, made a symbolic cut to the fence around the air base, and they were arrested and convicted of attempted criminal damage. He later stated that Conservative politician Lady Olga Maitland had warned him against the action, saying "Peter, Peter don’t do it – it’ll ruin your career."

=== Greenpeace ===
Melchett began working with Greenpeace UK in 1985, was appointed to the board of the charity in 1986, and took up the position of Executive Director of Greenpeace UK in 1989. He implemented the management systems and equal opportunities he had learned from working in the public sector, and is credited with helping to dramatically increase the organisation’s influence, supporter base, income and staff complement.

While at Greenpeace, he oversaw campaigns against whaling and against the dumping of nuclear waste into the sea at Sellafield nuclear plant, the prevention of Shell’s plans to dispose of its oil-storage buoy Brent Spar in the North Sea in 1995, and the abandonment of plans for the Millennium Dome to use PVC as a roofing material. He also oversaw the "greenfreeze" technology produced by Greenpeace for refrigerators, which replaced CFC refrigerants with non-harmful alternatives.

Greenpeace launched its global campaign against GM crops in 1997, and Melchett was arrested in 1999 when he took part in an environmental protest against a genetically modified maize trial in Lyng, Norfolk, at which GM maize was cut down and removed by 28 volunteers. Melchett spent a night in police custody and then a night in Norwich Prison before being released on bail. The case came to court in 2000 when Melchett and his 27 codefendants were acquitted of theft and criminal damage. Following the acquittal, The Independent said that Melchett had "achieved the highest profile of any UK environmental activist for a decade."

When he left Greenpeace UK in 2001, Melchett was the longest serving Executive Director of a Greenpeace national office. The UK model of campaigning was increasingly adopted by Greenpeace's other 30 national offices. He remained on the organisation's international board for two more years, and took up part-time consultancy work with IKEA, Iceland and Asda supermarkets and briefly with industry PR company Burson-Marsteller UK. Burson-Marsteller in the USA had formerly been PR consultants for the Monsanto Company, and Melchett stood down from the Greenpeace International Board following accusation that his employment with Burson-Marsteller compromised his integrity.

He was Policy Director at the Soil Association from 2002 until his death in 2018. During this time, he organised work on antibiotic and welfare abuse in farm animals, and campaigns against pesticides. He chaired the Food for Life Partnership, a successful school food programme, as well as its Food for Life Served Here awards which encouraged freshly prepared school meals free from trans fats, sweeteners and additives, with ingredients from sustainable and ethical sources.

Melchett played a leading role in guiding the Alliance to Save Our Antibiotics, an alliance of health, environmental and animal-welfare groups – coordinated by non-governmental organisations Compassion in World Farming, as policy director for the Soil Association and Sustain: the alliance for better food and farming, campaigning to stop the overuse of antibiotics in livestock. The Alliance was founded in 2009 and has helped put the issue of antibiotic resistance at the centre of farm policy. By 2018, large cuts in antibiotic use in British farming had been achieved, and the European Union had agreed to plans to ban routine farm antibiotic use.

He received an honorary doctorate from Newcastle University in 2013.

=== Panel and board memberships ===
Melchett was a member of the House of Lords Select Committee on Science and Technology (1981–1985), a member of the BBC's Rural Affairs Committee (2005–2018), the Government's Rural Climate Change Forum (2009–2010) and Organic Action Plan Group (2002–2008), and the Department for Education's School Lunches Review Panel (2005). Melchett was also on the board of the EU £12m Research Project 'Quality Low Input Food'.

== Political positions and ideology ==
Melchett was not opposed to genetically modified crops in principle, but was against the testing of the crops in fields, instead preferring laboratory testing. He saw the need to combine direct action with scientific argument in order to be effective.

== Personal life ==
Melchett was in a relationship with and was survived by Cassandra "Cass" Wedd for 45 years, although they were never married. They had two children who were educated at a comprehensive school instead of the family tradition of Eton College. Melchett's daughter Jessica Joan Mond-Wedd is a barrister, whilst his son, Jay Julian Mond Wedd, is a farmer.

Melchett was a vocal opponent of hereditary peerages and declared in a BBC Radio broadcast for Desert Island Discs that he had deprived his son Jay (who farms at the family farm in Ringstead) of the right to succeed him as 5th Baron Melchett, of Landford in the County of Southampton, and 5th Baronet of Hartford Hill in the County of Cheshire, because his son was born out of wedlock, which means the extinction of the barony and of the baronetcy upon his death.

Melchett became a vegetarian early in his life and continued this throughout, including refusing to eat fish.

== Coat of arms ==
Coat of arms of Peter Mond, 4th Baron Melchett
Notes Coat of arms of the Mond family Coronet A coronet of a Baron Crest A Demi-Bear holding between the paws a Fountain both proper. Escutcheon Quarterly: 1st and 4th, Gules a Demi-Lion rampant argent between in chief a Decrescent and an Increscent and in base a Crescent all Or on a Chief Argent an Eagle displayed between two Mullets Sable (Mond); 2nd and 3rd, Azure on a Pile between three Mullets Argent an Eagle displayed Sable (Lowenthal). Supporters Dexter: a Doctor of Science of the University of Oxford holding in the exterior hand a Chemical Measure Glass; Sinister: a Labourer holding in the exterior hand a Pick resting on the shoulder, all proper. Motto Make Yourself Necessary

Peerage of the United Kingdom
Preceded by Julian Mond	Baron Melchett; 1973–2018	Extinct
