= Sonia Melchett =

English socialite and author (1925–2026)

Sonia Elizabeth Sinclair, JP (née Graham; formerly Mond; 6 September 1925 – 17 August 2026), known as Sonia Melchett, was an English socialite and author. Once married to Julian Mond, Baron Melchett, she married the writer Andrew Sinclair after her husband's death.

== Early life ==
Sonia Melchett was born in Nainital, British India on 6 September 1925, the eldest daughter of Lt-Col Roland Harris Graham and Kathleen (née Dunbar) Graham, of The Lodge, Bridge, Kent. Her father, of a County Fermanagh family, was educated at Cambridge University and Trinity College, Dublin, and served in the Royal Army Medical Corps in the Second World War. Sonia Melchett was educated at the Royal School, Bath. Her younger sister Daphne married Major Anthony Henry Ivor Kinsman and became an actress, broadcaster and writer. She was the presenter of the BBC news programme Look North and wrote the book Pawn takes Castle.

== Personal life and death ==
Graham married the Honourable Julian Edward Alfred Mond, younger son of Henry Mond, 2nd Baron Melchett and Amy Gwen Mond Baroness Melchett (née Wilson) on 26 April 1947, and became Lady Melchett on the death of her father-in-law on 22 January 1949.

Melchett died on 17 August 2026, aged 100.

== Publications ==
- From the Ganges to The Thames: A Memoir, 2016. ISBN 9780704374102
- Passionate Quests Five Modern Women Travellers, Faber and Faber, 1992. ISBN 978-0-571-12946-1
- Someone is missing : a memoir, Weidenfeld & Nicolson, London, 1987 ISBN 978-0-297-79129-4 I
- Sons and Mothers, Virago Press, 1996 by Victoria Glendinning (Editor), Matthew Glendinning (Lady Sonia Melchett was one of seven contributors); ISBN 978-1-86049-254-9

== Sources ==
- Bright Young Things, Oxford University
- "Beyond the Fringe". The Independent on Sunday. 30 October 2005.
- "The Talk of the Town guide to Shocking London". The Independent on Sunday. 30 March 2003.
- BBC News, Tuesday, 27 July 1999 'Lord Melchett: Aristocrat eco-warrior'
- The Daily Telegraph, Mandrake, 'Reunited atlLast' 11.06. 2005,
- Anna Ford/Jonathan Aitken incident
- Michael Alexander, a member of the Chelsea Set
- Nigel Dempster, Daily Telegraph, 13.07.2007
