= List of Johnson & Johnson products and services =

This is a list of products and services provided by Johnson & Johnson (J&J).

== Medical technologies ==
In medical technologies, J&J's major franchises include interventional solutions, orthopedics, surgery, and vision.

- Heart and Cardiac
  - Abiomed
- Neurovascular (Cerenovus)
  - Embotrap III Revascularization Device
  - Embovac Aspiration Catheter
  - Cerenovus Large Bore Catheter
  - Cerenovus Nimbus
  - Cerebase DA Guide Sheath
  - Trufill n-BCA Liquid Embolic System
- Orthopedics (DePuy Synthes)
  - Velys Digital Surgery platform
  - Attune Cementless Fixed Bearing Knee
  - Actis Hip Stem
  - Inhance Shoulder System
  - Dynatape Suture
  - Trumatch Graft Cage
  - Symphony OCT System
- Surgery (Ethicon)
  - Vicryl
  - Echelon stapling products
  - Stratafix knotless tissue devices
  - Surgicel absorbable hemostats
  - Monarch platform
- Breast augmentation and reconstruction (Mentor)
  - MemoryGel Breast Implants
  - MemoryShape Breast Implants
  - Artoura Breast Tissue Expanders
  - CPX Breast Tissue Expenders
  - Mentor Saline Breast Implants
- Eye health (Johnson & Johnson Vision)
  - Acuvue
  - Tecnis
  - Catalys
  - TearScience
  - iDesign

== Pharmaceutical therapies ==
The company's major franchises in the pharmaceuticals segment include immunology, neuroscience, infectious disease and vaccines, oncology, cardiovascular and metabolism, and pulmonary hypertension.

- Immunology therapies
  - Icotyde (icotrokinra)
  - Remicade
  - Simponi
  - Simponi Aria
  - Stelara
  - Tremfya
- Infectious diseases therapies
  - Edurant
  - Intelence
  - Prezcobix
  - Symtuza
  - Janssen COVID-19 vaccine
- Neuroscience therapies
  - Concerta
  - Invega
  - Ponvory
  - Risperdal Consta
  - Spravato
  - Topamax
  - Trevicta
  - Xeplion
- Oncology therapies
  - Balversa
  - Carvykti
  - Dacogen
  - Darzalex
  - Eprex
  - Erleada
  - Imbruvica
  - Procrit
  - Rybrevant
  - Talvey
  - Tecvayli
  - Valchlor
  - Velcade
  - Yondelis
  - Zytiga
- Cardiovascular, metabolism, and retina therapies
  - Xarelto
  - Invokana
  - Invokamet
- Pulmonary hypertension therapies
  - Uptravi
  - Opsumit
  - Veletri
  - Tracleer
  - Ventavis
