= Sheri McCoy =

American scientist and business executive

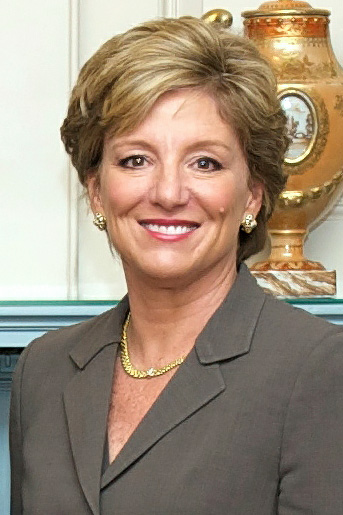
- Born: 1959 (age 66–67); Quincy, Massachusetts
- Education: Bachelor of Science (Textile Chemistry); Master of Science (Chemical Engineering); Master of Business Administration
- Alma mater: University of Massachusetts, Dartmouth; Princeton University; Rutgers University
- Occupations: business executive, scientist
- Years active: 1982–present
- Employer: Avon Products
- Known for: CEO of Avon Products; former Vice Chairman of Johnson & Johnson
- Predecessor: Andrea Jung
- Children: 3 sons

Sherilyn S. McCoy (born 1959) is an American scientist and business executive. She is the former CEO of Avon Products and former vice chairman and member of the office of the chairman of Johnson & Johnson, where she was responsible for the pharmaceutical and consumer business divisions of the company. She was appointed as the vice chairman in January 2011, after which she was named by Fortune Magazine, as the 10th woman on their list of "50 Most Powerful Women in Business", a list on which she has been included since 2008. In February 2012, she resigned her employment with Johnson & Johnson after 30 years and was subsequently named as the CEO of Avon Products. In August 2012, she was recognized as the 39th most powerful woman in the world by Forbes Magazine.

== Early life and education ==
Sherilyn S. "Sheri" McCoy was born in 1959, in Quincy, Massachusetts. She attended the University of Massachusetts, Dartmouth, earning her Bachelor of Science degree in textile chemistry. In 1982, she earned a master's degree in chemical engineering from Princeton University. She received her Master of Business Administration in 1988, from Rutgers University. She holds five patents registered in the United States and Europe.

== Career ==
=== Johnson & Johnson ===
McCoy joined Johnson & Johnson as a chemical engineer in 1982, where she focused on research and development of women's health products. She was eventually promoted to lead the company's research and development division, which was followed with a post as the global president of the division of the company that developed products that met the needs of infants, along with products that treated small injuries and wounds. In 2005, she was appointed to serve as the chairman of the Ethicon Endo-Surgery device division, where she was responsible for business in Latin America. She simultaneously served as a member of the Operating Committee of the Medical Device and Diagnostics Group.

=== Surgical Care and Pharmaceuticals Group ===
In 2008, McCoy was appointed to chair the Surgical Care Group. This leadership role established her as a member of the company's Executive Committee and one of the highest-ranking female executives in the global drug industry. On January 1, 2009, she was promoted to serve Johnson & Johnson as their Worldwide Chairman of the Pharmaceuticals Group, where she was responsible for new product development and distribution, along with acquisitions and partnerships. She also led the group during legal proceedings and loss of patent exclusivity. In 2010, she was promoted to Vice Chairman of the company.

=== Avon CEO ===
In February 2012, after 30 years of employment with Johnson & Johnson, McCoy was passed over for a promotion to succeed William C. Weldon as chief executive officer. When Alex Gorsky, head of the industry trade association known as Pharmaceutical Research and Manufacturers of America (PhRMA) and CEO of Novartis was named to succeed Weldon, McCoy resigned from Johnson & Johnson, effective April 18, 2012.

In March 2012, French beauty products manufacturer, Coty attempted a takeover of Avon Products, presenting an unsolicited $10 billion buyout offer. The bid was rejected by Avon shareholders, who believed that the company was worth more, stating that the monetary offer was way below the market value that would be feasible under the leadership of a new chief executive officer. On April 9, 2012, just two weeks after the takeover was rejected, it was announced that McCoy was chosen to lead Avon Products as their new CEO, effective April 23, 2012.

In early August 2017, Sheri McCoy was “terminated without cause” from her position as Avon CEO. She had been negotiating an exit since June. Sales had been depressed for several years.

== Board memberships ==
While employed with Johnson & Johnson, McCoy represented the company as a member of the Board of Directors of PhRMA, the National Quality Forum, and the Institute of Medicine's Roundtable on Value & Science-Driven Health Care.

Following her appointment as CEO of Avon Products, McCoy continues to serve on the Board of Directors of For Inspiration and Recognition of Science and Technology (FIRST), a nonprofit organization based out of Manchester, New Hampshire, that focuses on developing programs designed to inspire students to consider a career in the fields of engineering and technology. She is additionally a member of the Rutgers University President's Business Leaders Cabinet, while simultaneously serving on the board of Stonehill College, a Roman Catholic liberal arts college located in Easton, Massachusetts.

In October 2017, McCoy was appointed as a non-executive director of AstraZeneca.

== Honors and awards ==
- 2008: #44 "50 Most Powerful Women in Business" – Fortune Magazine
- 2009: #14 "50 Most Powerful Women in Business" – Fortune Magazine
- 2010: #12 "50 Most Powerful Women in Business" – Fortune Magazine
- 2011: #10 "50 Most Powerful Women in Business" – Fortune Magazine
- 2012: #7 "Most Powerful Mom of 2012" – Working Mother magazine
- 2012: #15 "World's Most Powerful Women in Business" – Forbes Magazine
- 2012: #39 "World's Most Powerful Women of 2012" – Forbes Magazine

== Patents ==
Sanitary napkin with panty gathering flaps

- US4900320: Filing date: June 16, 1986; Issue date: February 13, 1990
- EP0249924: Filing date: June 15, 1987; Issue date: March 4, 1992

Sanitary napkin

- USD327319: Filing date: February 9, 1990; Issue date: June 23, 1992

Sanitary napkin

- USD346213: Filing date: November 10, 1992; Issue date: April 19, 1994

Sanitary napkin

- USD352554: Filing date: November 16, 1992; Issue date: November 15, 1994

Raised center sanitary napkin with raised edges

- US5599337: Filing date: May 2, 1994; Issue date: February 4, 1997
- EP0685212: Filing date: February 28, 1995; Issue date: December 4, 2002
