= George F. Merson =

Scottish pharmacist

George Fowlie Merson FRSE FPS FCS (1866–1959) was a Scottish pharmacist who produced an artificial surgical catgut called Mersuture. In authorship he appears as G. F. Merson.

== Life ==
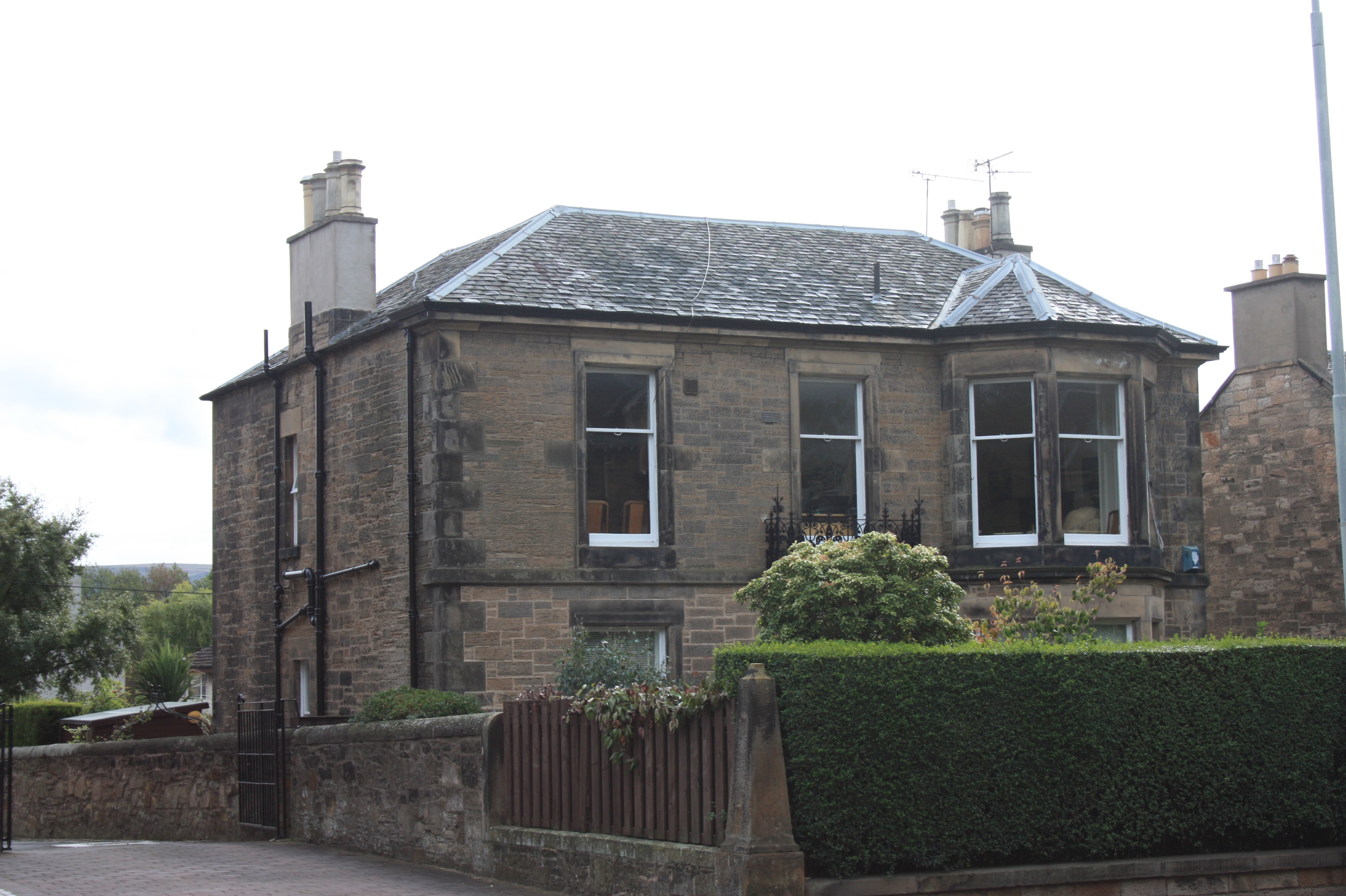
9 Hampton Terrace, Edinburgh

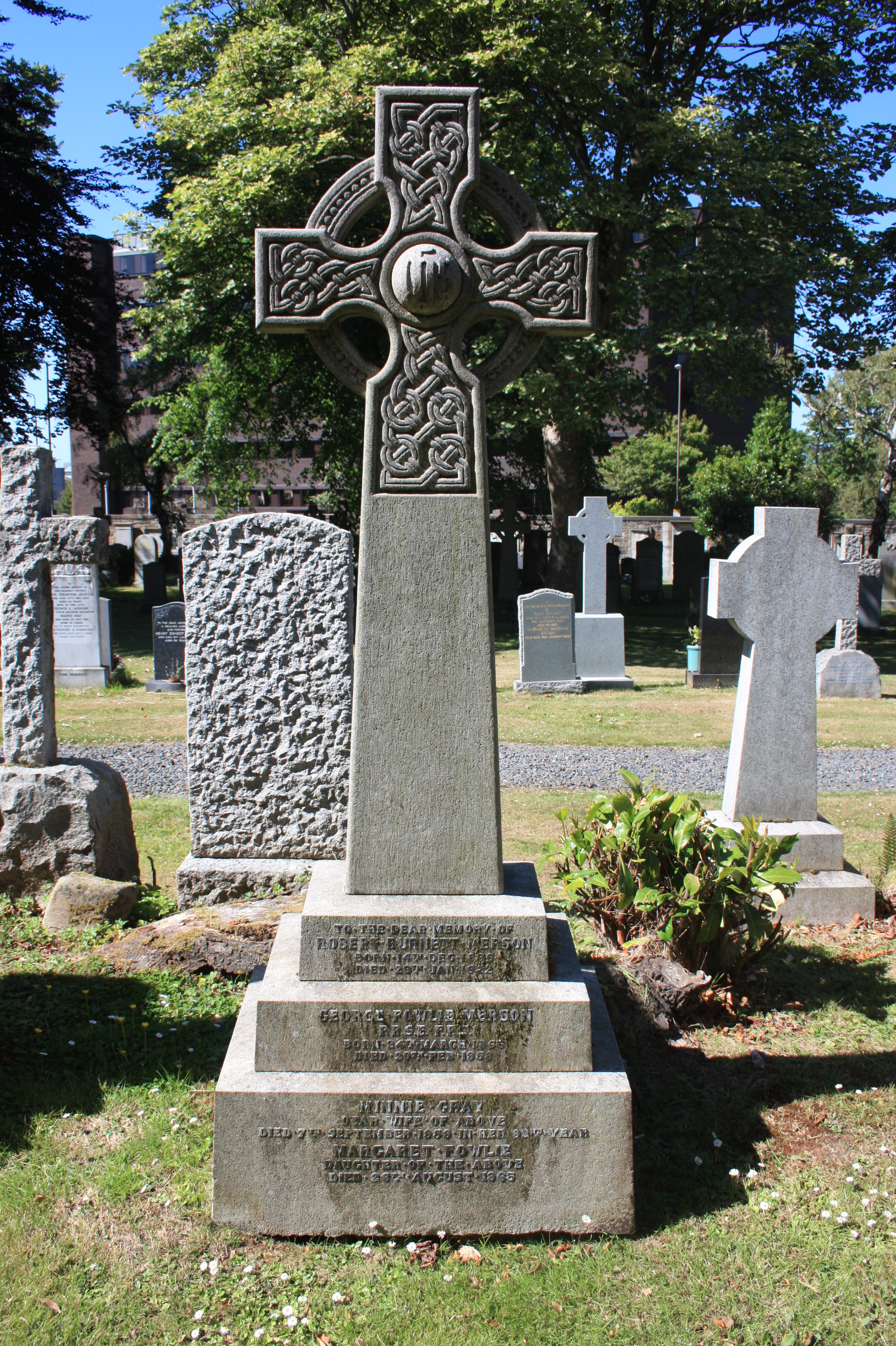
The grave of George F. Merson, Dean Cemetery

He was born in Fraserburgh in Aberdeenshire in 1866. He trained as a pharmacist.

In 1892 he was President of the Newcastle-upon-Tyne Chemists Assistants Association. In 1906 he was an examiner for the Pharmaceutical Society. He moved to Edinburgh around 1905.

Prior to the First World War Merson was employed by J.F.Macfarlan & Co in Northfield, Edinburgh, in their suture business. Around 1915 he and his wife started to experiment in his kitchen in Edinburgh, to see whether he could manufacture an artificial Catgut.

Mr and Mrs Merson conducted experiments in their kitchen saucepans involving sheep intestines and smells of which only a catgut manufacture can understand. These experiments were carried out in a private house in Edinburgh where it was customary for the kitchen pulley to be a very strong structure for drying clothes was used for stretching their experimental catgut process that was later tested by his surgeon friends.

Finding success in his experiments he rented a small factory in Meuse Lane, behind Jenners on Princes Street. The company's first catalogue in 1917 describes a wide range of catgut products – either in rolls or sterilised by Iodine in glass tubes.

In 1917, in recognition of his important scientific advances, he was elected a Fellow of the Royal Society of Edinburgh. His proposers were Leonard Dobbin, Sir David Paulin, Sir James Walker and James Haig Ferguson.

In 1920 Merson moved his business to larger premises on St. John's Hill, as need for sutures was increasing. The Iodine process was used for sterilising catgut string, which thereafter was dried in the open air becoming contaminated thereby – and then transferred to Glass tubes in which it was re-sterilised by iodine solution and then, by a process of aseptic transfer, the iodine was decolourised by thiosulphate which, in turn, by further aseptic transfer, was replaced by a tubing fluid containing phenyl mercuric nitrate. The tubes were then sealed by heat. This process had been in use right from 1915 with various modifications and improvements.

In 1925 he was living at 9 Hampton Terrace in the west of Edinburgh, facing onto Donaldson's School.

Johnson & Johnson bought the company "G.F.Merson Limited" in 1947, and it was renamed 'Ethicon Suture Laboratories and relocated to Sighthill.

George Merson maintained an active interest in Ethicon Inc. until his death. For several years before his death, he had invited the Directors by personal invitations to a dinner once a year at the Conservative Club in Princes Street, Edinburgh. This usually occurred in January to talk about the accomplishments of the previous year and gave him an opportunity to comment on plans for the future. After his death, this practice was continued each year by the Directors.

He died in Edinburgh on 20 February 1958. He is buried in Dean Cemetery. The grave is marked by a granite Celtic cross and lies close to the centre of the 20th century northern extension on Queensferry Road.

== Family ==
Around 1895 he married Minnie Gray Burnett (1867–1959).

Their son Robert Burnett Merson died in 1922, aged only 25.

== Recognition ==
A plaque to G.F.Merson plaque (dating from 1920) is held at the Ethicon building in Livingston, Scotland.
