= Henry N. Cobb =

American architect (1926–2020)

- Born: Henry Nichols Cobb; April 8, 1926; Boston, Massachusetts, U.S.
- Died: March 2, 2020 (aged 93); New York City, U.S.
- Education: Phillips Exeter Academy; Harvard University
- Occupation: Architect

Henry Nichols Cobb (April 8, 1926 – March 2, 2020) was an American architect and founding partner with I.M. Pei and Eason H. Leonard of Pei Cobb Freed & Partners, an international architectural firm based in New York City.

== Early life ==
Henry N. Cobb was born in Boston, Massachusetts, the son of Elsie Quincy (Nichols) and Charles Kane Cobb, an investment counselor. He attended Phillips Exeter Academy, Harvard College, and the Harvard University Graduate School of Design.

== Career ==
Cobb was an architect. Additionally, he was the chairman of the Department of Architecture at Harvard University from 1980 to 1985. He received honorary degrees from Bowdoin College and the Swiss Federal Institute of Technology.

As a student at Harvard University in 1947, Cobb traveled to Poland with a group of American architects to learn about post-war reconstruction efforts in the country. During his time there, Cobb took over 100 photographs of the post-war aftermath in Polish cities, including Warsaw, Katowice, Piekary Śląskie, Szczecin, and Wrocław. A unique aspect of his photographs specifically was that they were taken in color, a rare feature at the time. These are now included in the book "Barwy Ruin: Warszawa i Polska w odbudowie na zdjęciach Henry'ego N. Cobba" by Maria Sołtys and Krzysztof Jaszczyński.

In 1983, he was elected into the National Academy of Design as an Associate Academician, and became a full Academician in 1990. Cobb won the Council on Tall Buildings and Urban Habitat's 2013 Lynn S. Beedle Award, and was awarded the Architectural League of New York's President's Medal in 2015.

== Personal life and death ==
Cobb lived in New York City and North Haven, Maine. He died on March 2, 2020, in Manhattan at the age of 93.

== Notable buildings ==
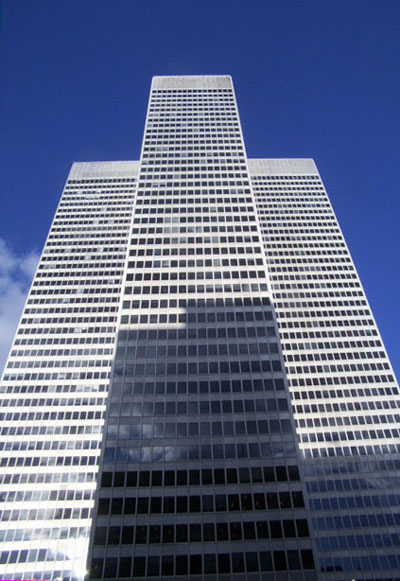
Place Ville Marie in Montreal (1962)

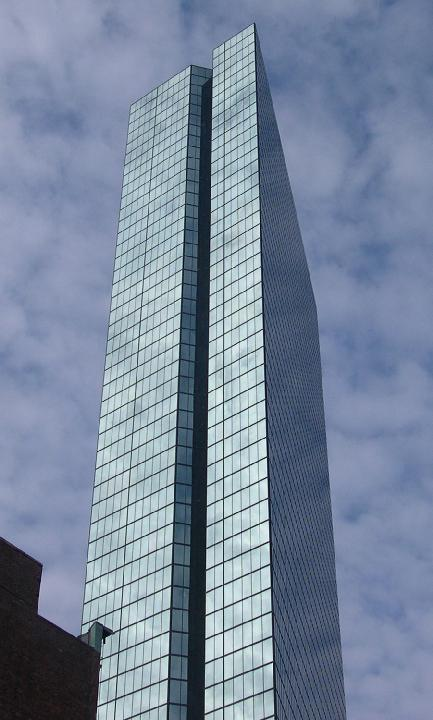
John Hancock Tower, Boston (1976)

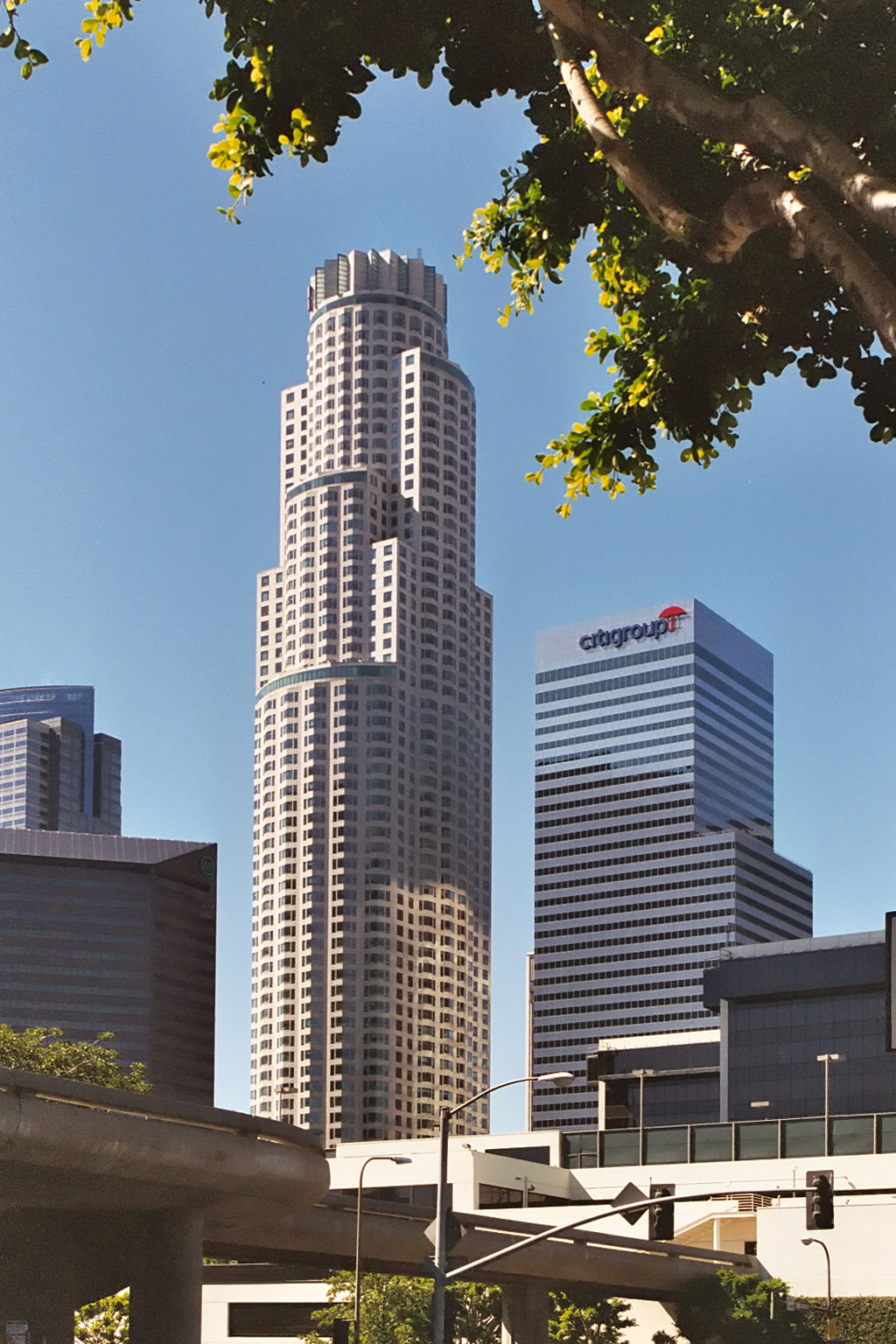
U.S. Bank Tower (center), Los Angeles (1990)

Notable buildings for which Cobb was principally responsible include:

- Place Ville Marie in Montreal (1962)
- Campus of the State University of New York Fredonia (1968)
- Harbor Towers, Boston (1971)
- John Hancock Tower, Boston (1976)
- Wilson Commons at the University of Rochester (1976)
- World Trade Center, Baltimore (1977)
- One Dallas Centre, Dallas (1979)
- Johnson and Johnson Plaza, New Brunswick, New Jersey (1983)
- ARCO Tower, Dallas (1983)
- Charles Shipman Payson Building, Portland Museum of Art, Portland, Maine (1983)
- Pitney Bowes World Headquarters, Stamford, Connecticut (1985)
- Library Tower, Los Angeles (1989), now U.S. Bank Tower
- Credit Suisse First Boston headquarters at Canary Wharf, London (1992)
- UCLA Anderson School of Management at the University of California, Los Angeles (1995)
- American Association for the Advancement of Science headquarters, Washington, D.C. (1996)
- John Joseph Moakley United States Courthouse and Harborpark, Boston (1998)
- College-Conservatory of Music at the University of Cincinnati (1999)
- World Trade Center Barcelona, Barcelona (1999)
- National Constitution Center, Philadelphia (2003)
- Hyatt Center, Chicago (2005)
- Palazzo Lombardia, Milan, Italy (2005)
- International Monetary Fund Headquarters 2, Washington, D.C. (2005)
- Center for Government and International Studies at Harvard University (2005)
- 1 Memorial Drive, Federal Reserve Bank of Kansas City (2008)
- Torre Espacio, Madrid, Spain (2008)
- 200 West Street, New York (2009)
- Palazzo Lombardia, Milan (2010)
- 7 Bryant Park, New York (2016)
- Four Seasons Hotel & Private Residences, One Dalton Street, Boston (2019)

== Gallery ==
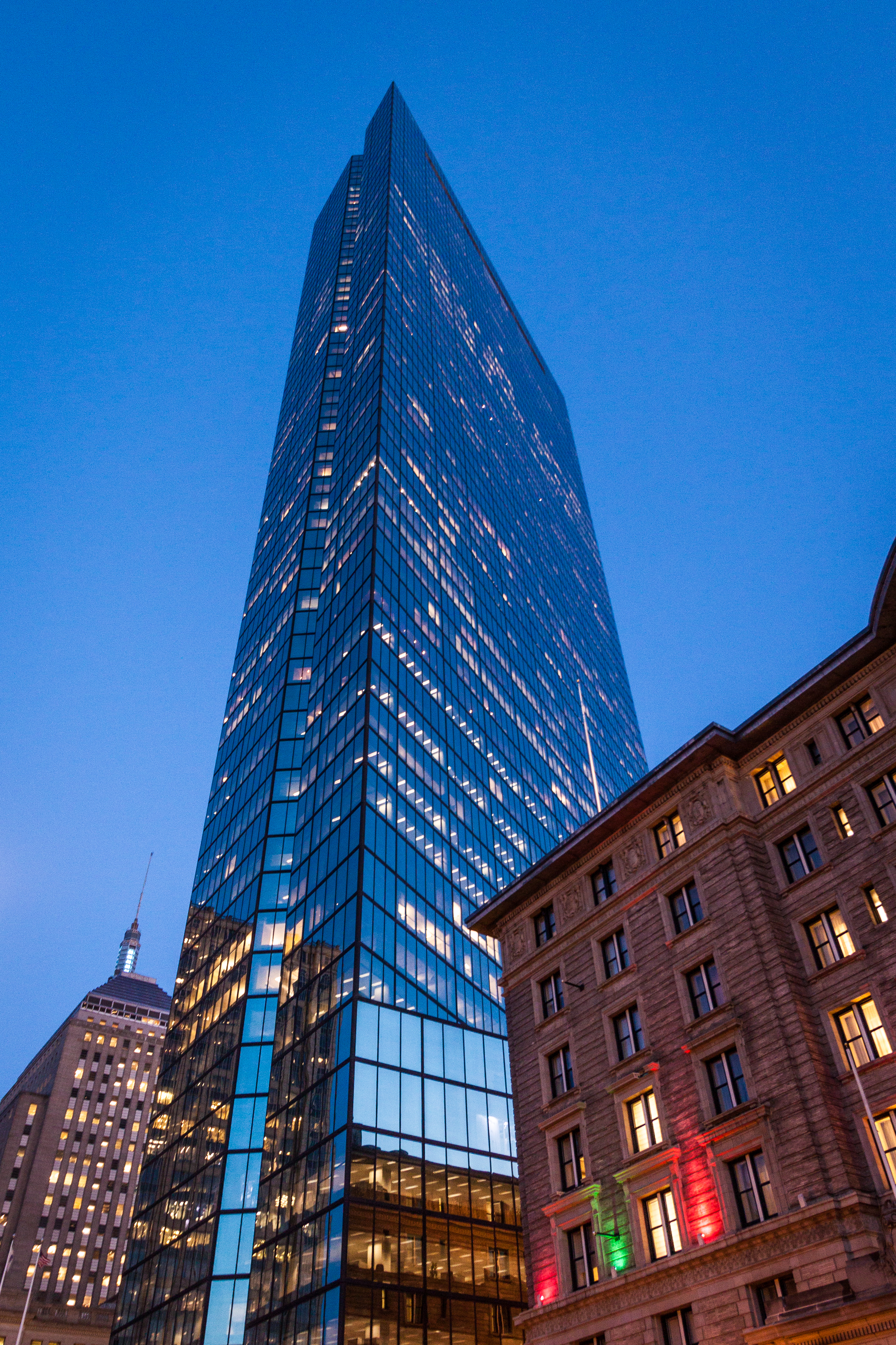
200 Clarendon, formerly John Hancock Tower, Boston, MA (1976)

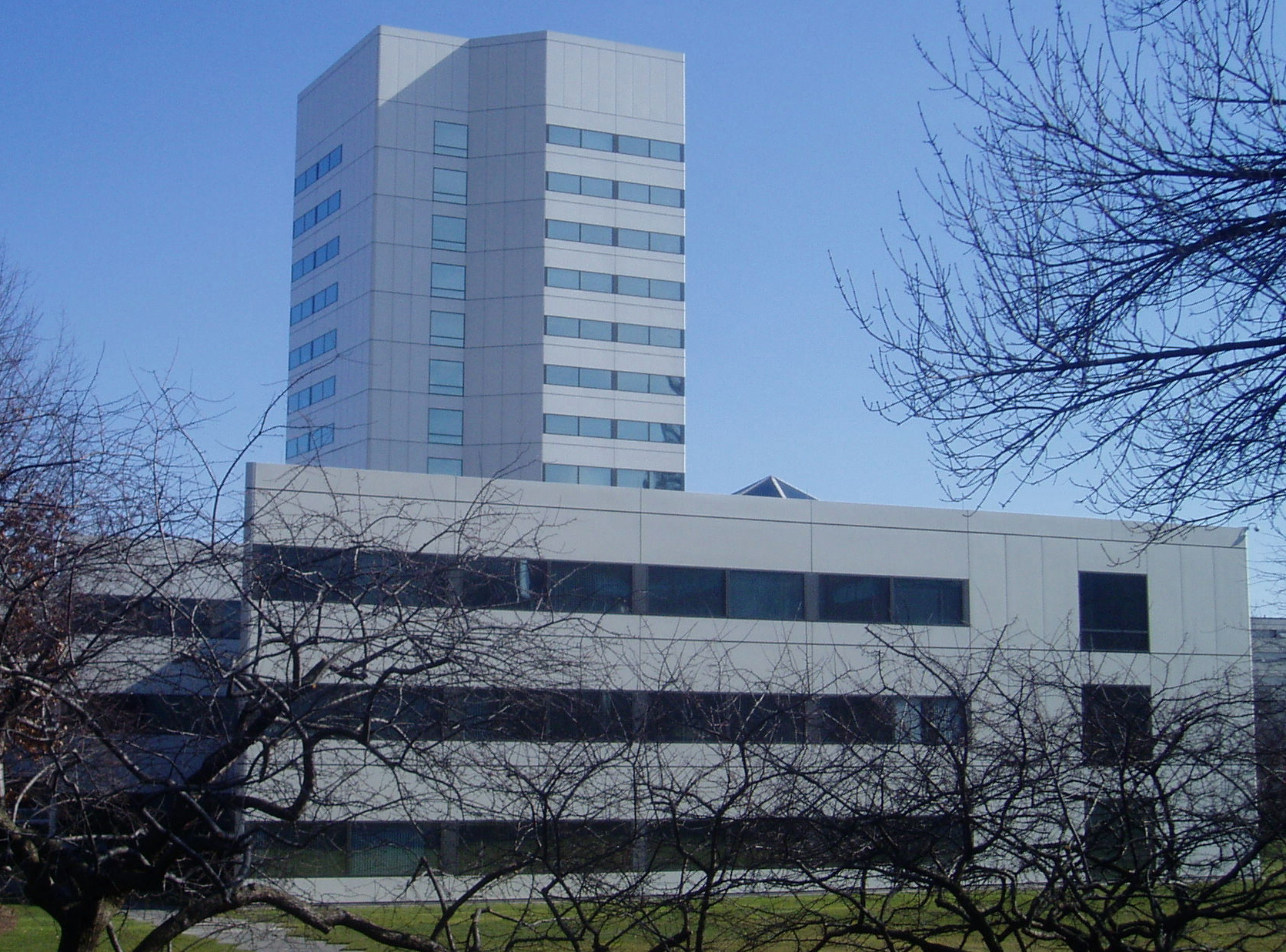
Johnson & Johnson Headquarters, New Brunswick, NJ (1983)

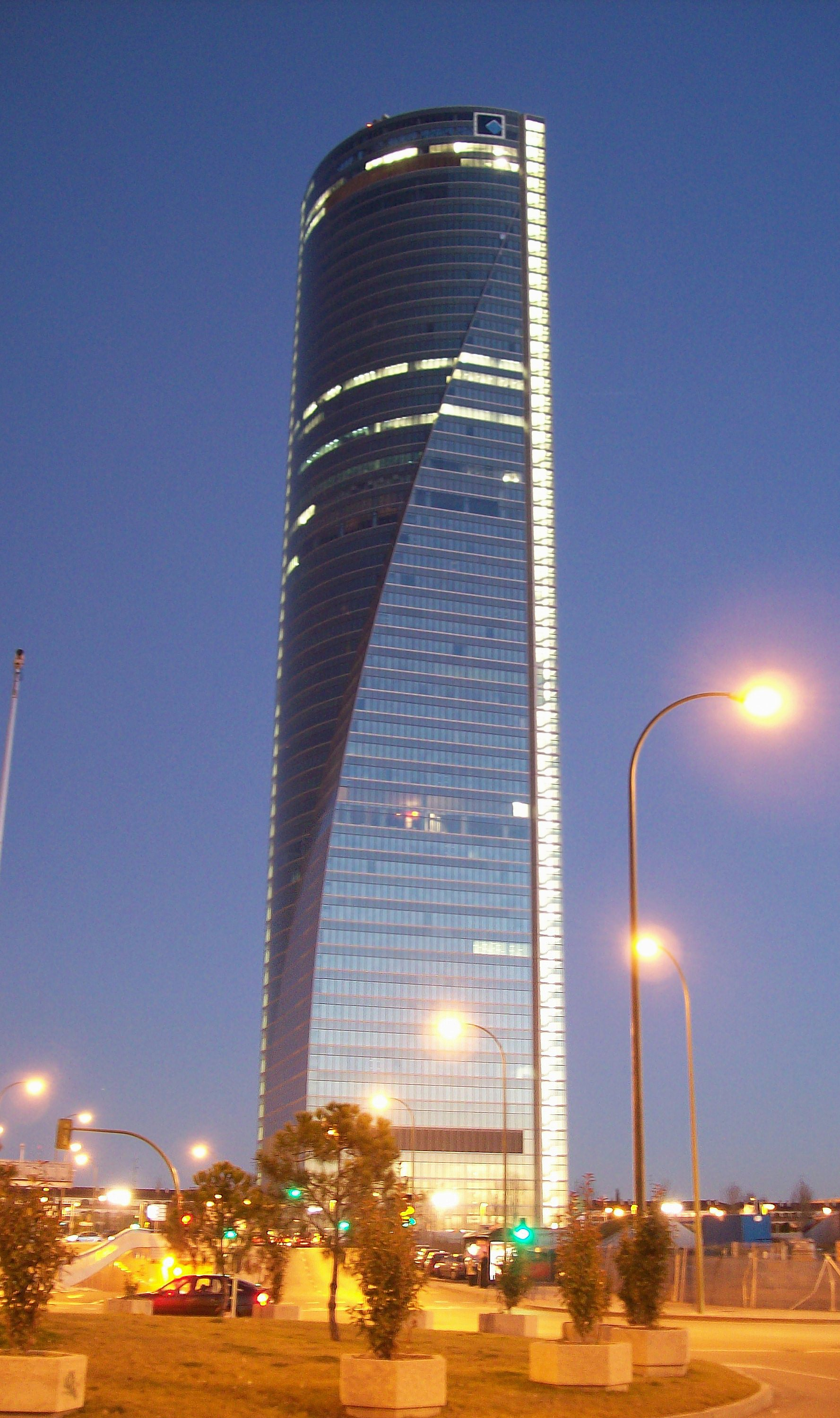
Torre Espacio, Madrid, Spain (2008)

== Bibliography ==
- Henry N. Cobb: Words & Works 1948–2018: Scenes from a Life in Architecture (2018). Monacelli Press. ISBN 9781580935142.
