= William Weldon =

William Weldon may refer to:

- Casey Bill Weldon (William Weldon, 1909–c. 1970), American country blues musician
- William C. Weldon, chief executive officer of Johnson & Johnson
- William Weldon (officer of arms), officer of arms at the College of Arms in London
