= Things We Read =

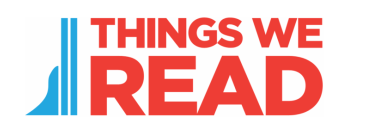
- Formation: 2011
- Type: 501(C)(3) corporation
- Purpose: Literary services, military services
- Co-founders: Chris Molaro, Garrison Haning

Things We Read (TWR) was a charity and military service organization that promoted reading by collecting book recommendations from influential citizens and donating books to members of the armed forces and local communities. It operated as a nonprofit 501(C)(3) organization.

== About ==
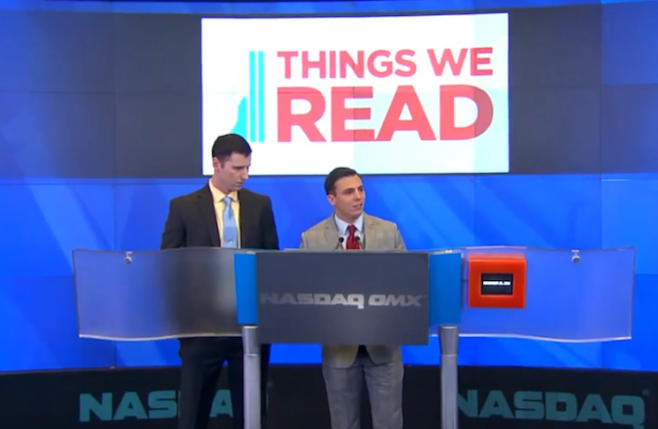
Things We Read CEO Chris Molaro and President Garrison Haning ring opening bell at NASDAQ.

Things We Read was started in 2011 by two US Army officers serving in Iraq during Operation New Dawn. Co-founders Chris Molaro and Garrison Haning wanted to establish constructive ways for soldiers to spend their free time. During deployment, they noticed that too many soldiers occupied their off-time by playing video games. Soldiers weren't taking productive breaks from the stresses of war. The two officers started collecting book lists from respected leaders in their unit to distribute to soldiers.

When Molaro and Haning returned from Iraq, they decided to form a non-profit that would leverage the power of book recommendations to inspire soldiers to read. Things We Read collects and aggregates book recommendations from military commanders, business leaders, politicians, musicians, athletes, actors, and authors. The organization donates books from its reading lists to soldiers and local communities.

== Book list contributors ==
- Jeff Arnett
- Senator Mark Begich
- Mayim Bialik
- LeVar Burton
- Lt. General Robert Caslen
- Thurston Clark
- Max Collins
- Anderson Cooper
- Joe Cross
- Mark Cuban
- Landon Donovan
- Mike Erwin
- Joseph Galloway
- Bill Gates
- Malcolm Gladwell
- Alex Gorsky
- US Secretary of Defense Chuck Hagel
- LeBron James
- Dr. Paul Jaminet
- Coach K
- Dr. Douglas Merrill
- Wes Moore
- Bill Murray
- Elon Musk
- Governor Martin O'Malley
- John Ondrasik (Five for Fighting)
- Nick Padlo
- Mike Rowe
- Mark Sisson
- Dr. Tommy Sowers
- Admiral James Stavridis
- Maj. General William Suter
- Representative Chris Van Hollen
- Dan Wilbur
