= Ralph S. Larsen =

American businessman

Ralph S. Larsen (November 18, 1938 – March 9, 2016) was an American businessman. He was the chief executive officer (CEO) of Johnson & Johnson from 1989 to 2002.

== Early life and education ==
Ralph Larsen was born in Brooklyn, New York City in a family of five siblings in 1938. His father was a first-generation immigrant from Norway. He joined the United States Navy for a few years. He worked his way through college, taking electrical jobs, and he received a Bachelor of Business Administration from Hofstra University in 1962.

== Career ==
Larsen joined Johnson & Johnson as a trainee in 1962, and worked there until 1981. In 1979 he was part of a team that helped turn the painkiller Tylenol into a blockbuster drug, with annual sales rising from $70 million to $500 million. In 1981–1983 he worked as president of consumer products at Becton Dickinson. In 1983 he re-joined Johnson & Johnson as president of Chicopee until 1986, and he was vice-chairman of the corporation until 1989. He served as CEO in 1989 to 2002. From 1994 to 1999 he reduced the annual operating costs to $2 billion to make the company more competitive. He also produced a consecutive string of 25% shareholder return rates.

Larsen was on the board of directors of General Electric and AT&T. In 1998–2000 he was on the board of Xerox. He was on the international advisory board of Salomon Smith Barney. From 1999 to 2000 he was chairman of The Business Council.

In 1998 dozens of federal agents raided the headquarters of Johnson & Johnson's LifeScan unit after it failed to notify the Food and Drug Administration of a software glitch in a diabetes diagnostic device that it manufactured. In 2000 LifeScan pleaded guilty to criminal charges and agreed to pay $60 million in fines for selling defective monitoring devices. The company said that while no one at LifeScan had intentionally engaged in wrongdoing, the device was deficient, the company had not properly notified the government, and it had been slow to fix the problem. “Mistakes and misjudgments were made,” Larsen wrote in a statement of apology at the time.

Larsen was a Republican. He was a fellow of the American Academy of Arts and Sciences. He was on the board of trustees of the Robert Wood Johnson Foundation.

== Personal life ==
Larsen was married to Dorothy Zeitfuss, and they had three children. Larsen died in Naples, Florida, on March 9, 2016.

Business positions
Preceded by James E. Burke	President of Johnson & Johnson; 1989-2002	Succeeded by William C. Weldon
