= Johnson & Johnson Vision =

Ophthalmology division of Johnson & Johnson

- Type: Subsidiary
- Industry: Ophthalmology
- Founded: 1976; 50 years ago, in Santa Ana, California
- Headquarters: Irvine, California & Jacksonville, Florida
- Key people: Peter Menziuso (president)
- Products: Ophthalmic pharmaceuticals Surgical equipment Contact care products
- Number of employees: 4,500
- Parent: Johnson & Johnson
- Website: jnjvisionpro.com

Johnson & Johnson Vision (JJV) is a subsidiary of Johnson & Johnson and is composed of two divisions, Johnson & Johnson Surgical Vision and Johnson & Johnson Vision Care (Contact Lens). The company is part of Johnson & Johnson MedTech business segment. Services include Intraocular lenses, laser vision correction systems, phacoemulsification systems, viscoelastic, Microkeratomes and related products used in cataract and refractive surgery.

Johnson and Johnson Surgical Vision is based in Santa Ana, California, and Johnson & Johnson Vision Care is based in Jacksonville, Florida. JJV employs approximately 4,200 worldwide. The company has operations in 24 countries and markets products in approximately 60 countries. In February 2017, Abbott Medical Optics changed its name to Johnson & Johnson Vision following its $4.3 billion acquisition by Johnson & Johnson.

== History ==
In 1959, the contact business unit started as Frontier Contact Lenses in Buffalo, New York.

The surgical business unit started when implantable medical device company Heyer-Schulte Co., started a ophthalmic research division, named Heyer-Schulte Medical Optics Center (HSMOC), focusing on aphakic lenses and extended-wear cosmetic contact lenses. In 1974, American Hospital Supply Corporation (AHSC), acquired and merged with Heyer-Schulte Co., and renamed HSMOC to American Medical Optics (AMO). In 1976, AMO focused its business in the early development of intraocular lenses for cataract patients.

In 1981, Johnson & Johnson acquires Frontier.

In 1983, American Medical Optics, the Santa Ana eye product division of American Hospital Supply Corp., began to manufacture the tissue lens.

In 1986, Allergan acquired American Medical Optics, and as Allergan Medical Optics, continued to manufacture the lenticules.

In 1987, JJV introduces the world's first disposable soft contact lenses under the name ACUVUE Brand Contact Lenses.

AMO was spun off from Allergan in 2002.

In 2004, Advanced Medical Optics bought Pfizer's surgical ophthalmology business for $450 million in cash.

AMO acquired VisX Inc. in a stock and cash transaction valued at approximately $1.27 billion, in November 2004. The combined company retained the Advanced Medical Optics name and AMO's Santa Ana, Calif., headquarters. The laser franchise retained the VisX brand name, and VisX continued manufacturing and research and development activities at its Santa Clara, Calif., site. The AMO portfolio already included the Amadeus II microkeratome, the Verisyse phakic IOL, and the ReZoom, Array and Tecnis IOLs.

In Jan. 16, 2007 AMO announced the acquisition of privately held WaveFront Sciences Inc., a provider of wavefront diagnostic systems for refractive surgery and medical research, for $20 million in cash.

AMO acquired Irvine-based IntraLase Corp. for $808 million in January 2007. This allowed AMO to combine IntraLase technology for cutting a flap in the cornea with AMO technology for reshaping the cornea. The combination of these complementary technologies has made "all-laser LASIK" possible. NASA later approved this all-laser LASIK for use on astronauts.

In August 2007 the company donated $2.5 million to UC-Irvine's Department of Ophthalmology to boost the university's planned Eye Institute.

On February 26, 2009, Abbott Laboratories announced that it had completed its acquisition of Advanced Medical Optics (AMO) in a $2.8 billion deal. AMO had become a wholly owned subsidiary of Abbott and was renamed Abbott Medical Optics Inc (AMO).

In 2009, AMO bought Visiogen and 2013, OptiMedica.

In September 2016, pharmaceutical and medical device company Johnson & Johnson announced they were buying Abbott Medical Optics for $4.3 billion.

On February 27, 2017, Abbott Medical Optics changed its name to Johnson & Johnson Vision following its $4.3 billion acquisition by Johnson & Johnson.

In 2017, JJV acquired TearScience.

== Products ==
- Corneal products:
  - RevitaLens OcuTec Multi-Purpose Disinfecting Solution
  - COMPLETE Multi-Purpose Solution Easy Rub Formula
  - Blink Tears Lubricating Eye Drops
  - Oxysept UltraCare Formula Peroxide Disinfection System
  - Ultrazyme Enzymatic Cleaner
  - Blink Contacts Lubricating Eye Drops
  - COMPLETEBlink-N-Clean Lens Drops
  - COMPLETE Lubricating and Rewetting Drops
- Refractive Products (LASIK)
  - STAR S4 IR Excimer Laser
  - WaveScan WaveFront System
  - IntraLase FS Laser
  - Advanced CustomVue Procedure
  - iFS Advanced Femtosecond Laser
- Cataract Products
  - Tecnis Multifocal Intraocular lens
  - ReZoom Multifocal Intraocular lens
  - Tecnis 1-Piece Intraocular lens
  - WHITESTAR Signature Phacoemulsification System
  - Sovereign Compact Phacoemulsification System
  - Healon Viscoelastics
  - Baerveldt Glaucoma Implants
  - StabilEyes Capsular Tension Ring
  - Catalys Precision Laser System

== Voluntary recalls ==
AMO voluntarily recalled some of their products in 2006 due to a bacterial contamination in the factory process which would have compromised sterility. Non-sterility of a contact lens solution may have serious health consequences, including eye infection and microbial keratitis. The voluntary and limited recall was caused by an isolated production line problem that affected two of the four production lines in the AMO facility, not because of a formulation issue.

In May 2007, the Centers for Disease Control and Prevention linked AMO MoisturePlus eye solution to Acanthamoeba keratitis infections. AMO announced a recall on Complete MoisturePlus contact lens solution on May 28, 2007. The solution has been linked to cases of an eye infection (keratitis) caused by an organism of the genus Acanthamoeba. The company was sued in June 2007 by Michael Connolly, who claimed to have developed a keratitis infection after using AMO's MoisturePlus solution.

Complaints about a contact lens solution linked to a 2007 outbreak of eye infections that blinded several people went unreported by the manufacturer for more than a year. Advanced Medical Optics received complaints about the solution more than a year before it was recalled, and failed to promptly report nine complaints as required by law.
