= Alex Gorsky =

American businessman (born 1960)

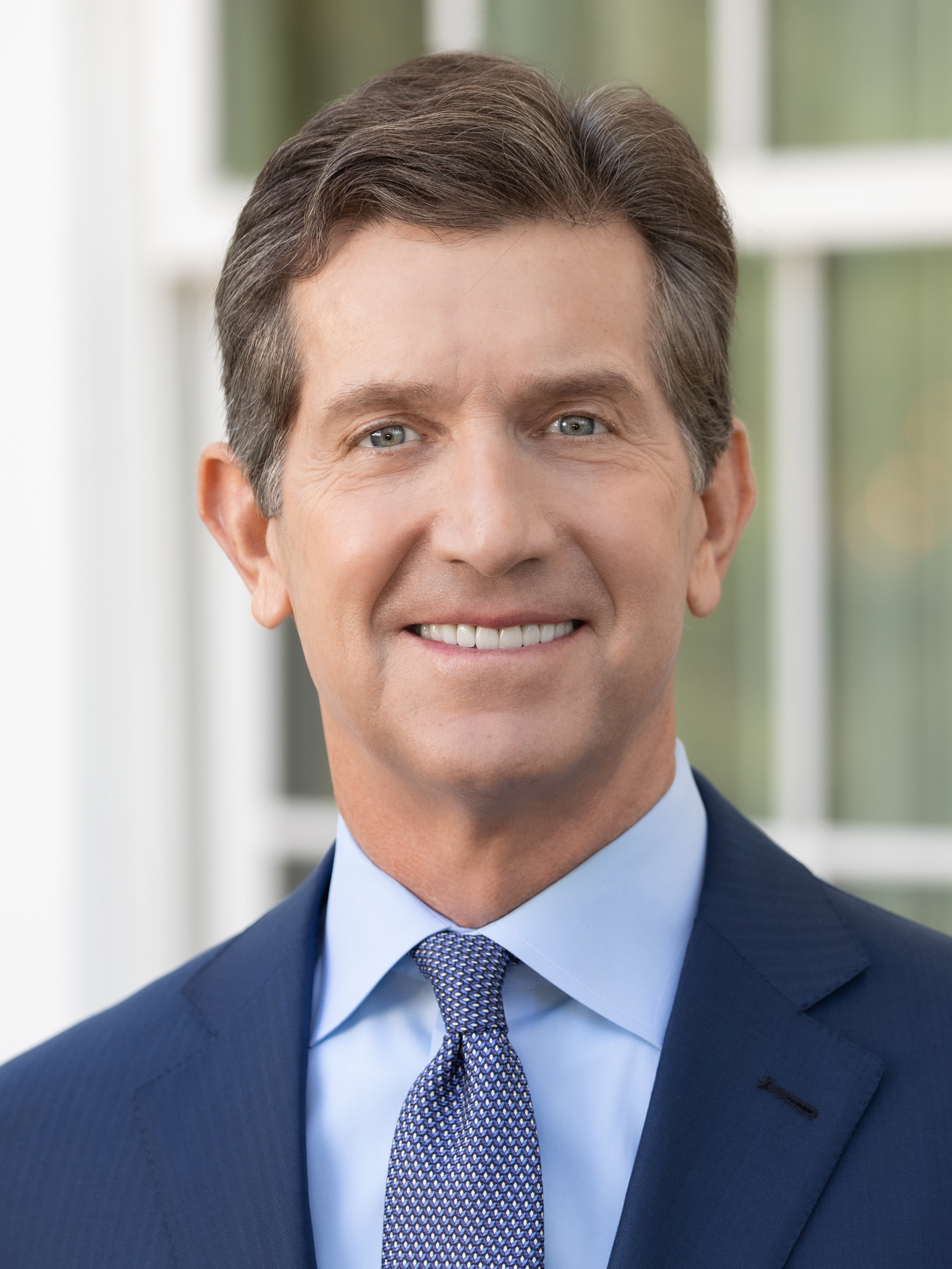
- Gorsky in 2021
- Born: 1960 (age 65–66); Kansas City, Kansas, U.S.
- Education: United States Military Academy (BS); University of Pennsylvania (MBA)
- Years active: 1988–present
- Spouse: Patricia Gorsky
- Children: 1

Alex Gorsky (born 1960) is an American businessman. He is the former chairman and CEO of Johnson & Johnson. Gorsky stepped down as CEO of Johnson & Johnson in January 2022 and was succeeded by Joaquin Duato. He was the seventh person who was the company's chairman and CEO since it became a publicly traded company in 1944. He is a board director of Apple and JP Morgan Chase.

== Early life and education ==
Gorsky's grandparents immigrated to the United States from Russia and Croatia. Gorsky was the third of six children of Albert and Loretta (née Bartolac) Gorsky in Kansas City, Kansas. When he was 12, his family moved to Fremont, Michigan, where his father, a Korean War veteran, took a job as a marketing executive for Gerber Foods. In high school, Gorsky was captain of the varsity football team, assuming positions as quarterback and linebacker. He was also captain of the swimming team.

In 1977, as a member of Boy's State, Gorsky was chosen to represent Michigan at the Boy's Nation national conference. In the same year, Congressman Guy Vander Jagt nominated Gorsky to attend the United States Military Academy at West Point. In 1981, Gorsky was one of the cadets chosen for the Ranger School where he earned a Ranger Tab. In May 1982, when Gorsky graduated from West Point with a Bachelor of Science degree, he joined the Artillery Branch of the U.S Army. As lieutenant at the age of 22, he led an artillery platoon. After six years as an officer, serving in Europe and Panama, he became captain in 1987. In 1988, Gorsky married Patricia Dittrich, a hospital nurse in Carmel, California. Gorsky left the Army in 1988.

Gorsky earned his Master of Business Administration from The Wharton School at the University of Pennsylvania in 1996.

== Career ==
=== Janssen ===
Gorsky joined Johnson & Johnson in 1988 as a sales representative in its pharmaceutical business unit, Janssen Pharmaceuticals. He held various management and leadership roles at Janssen before becoming Company Group Chairman overseeing Europe, Middle East, and Africa in 2003.

Gorsky led the marketing of products such as Risperdal. Ultimately Johnson & Johnson was fined $2.2 billion for strategies that downplayed the drug's side effects, encouraged off-label use, and provided kickback payments to Omnicare, a company that provided drug services to nursing homes.

=== Novartis ===
Gorsky joined the Novartis Pharmaceuticals Corporation in 2004 as chief operating officer and head of General Medicines. In 2005, he was appointed Head of Pharmaceuticals North America and Chief Executive Officer. During his tenure, he created the CEO Diversity & Inclusion Award. He oversaw the growth of its cardiovascular and other franchises.

=== Johnson & Johnson ===
Gorsky returned to Johnson & Johnson in 2008 when he was appointed company group chairman for Ethicon, Inc. In September 2009, he was promoted to worldwide chairman, medical devices & diagnostics. Then-CEO William C. Weldon chose Gorsky to be vice chairman in the office of the chairman. In April 2012, Gorsky was appointed chief executive officer. In December 2012, Gorsky was appointed chairman. A longtime advocate of diversity and inclusion, Gorsky was named one of the "100 Most Inspiring Leaders" by Pharma Voice.

Gorsky oversaw the company's legal defense against talc class action suits and opioid lawsuits. In January 2020, Gorsky testified at the New Jersey trial about Johnson & Johnson's baby powder product.

Under Gorsky's leadership, the company stock more than tripled, and averaged more than a 15% annual return, surpassing the S&P 500. Johnson & Johnson's market capitalization went from nearly $180 billion to more than $470 billion.

Gorsky was the executive sponsor of the J&J Women's Leadership Initiative and the Veteran's Leadership Council. In 2021, with a salary of $23.14 million, he ranked second on the list of highest-paid CEOs in healthcare, according to Becker's Hospital Review.

Gorsky was the speaker at The Wharton School at the University of Pennsylvania 2022 MBA graduation ceremony.

== Other roles ==
Gorsky is a member of The Business Council's executive committee and was chair of the Business Roundtable Corporate Governance Committee. Since 2014, Gorsky has been on the board of directors at IBM. Gorsky is a board member at Apple, Inc., JPMorgan Chase, and the National Academy Foundation. He is on the advisory board at Thayer Leader Development Group at West Point, and is co-chair of the Strategic Investor Initiative (SII) advisory board at Chief Executives for Corporate Purpose (CECP). Gorsky is a member of the Bipartisan Policy Center's CEO Council on Health and Innovation and of The Wharton Leadership Advisory Board. Gorsky is vice chairman of the Travis Manion Foundation. Gorsky was on the American Manufacturing Council, and was a member of the American Heart Association CEO Roundtable.

== Philanthropy and awards ==
- Gorsky and his wife Pat donated to the Doylestown Health Foundation twice; $5 million in 2017 and $5 million in 2022.
- Mentor of the Year by the Healthcare Businesswomen's Association in 2009
- Joseph Wharton Leadership Award in 2014
- CADCA Humanitarian of the Year Award in 2014
- Corporate Humanitarian Award by Operation Smile in 2015
- Appeal of Conscience Award by Appeal of Conscience Foundation in 2015.
- ROBIE Award by the Jackie Robinson Foundation in 2017
- Ripple of Hope Award by Robert F Kennedy Human Rights in 2017
- Honorary Doctorate from Thomas Jefferson University in 2018
- Diversity Inc. Global Inclusive Leaders Award in 2018
- Honorary Doctorate from Ferris State University College of Health Profession and Michigan College of Optometry
- West Point Distinguished Graduate Award in 2020
- Gorsky was ranked #2 on the NJBIZ Manufacturing Power 50 list in 2020
- Legend in Leadership Award by Yale School of Management in 2021
- Red Jacket Award by PharmaVoice 2021
- BENS Eisenhower Award 2021
