= Vicryl =

Suture material

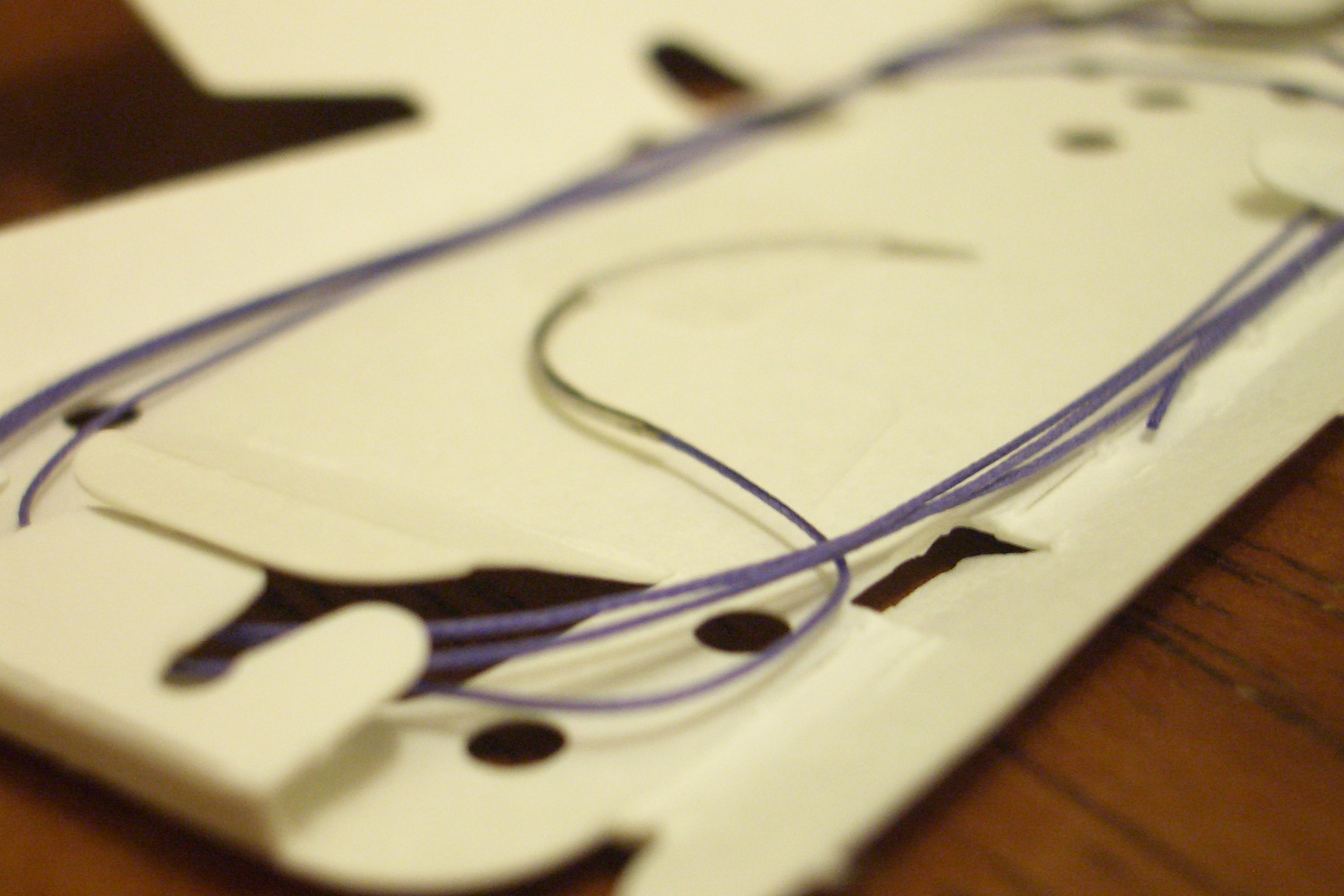
Suture

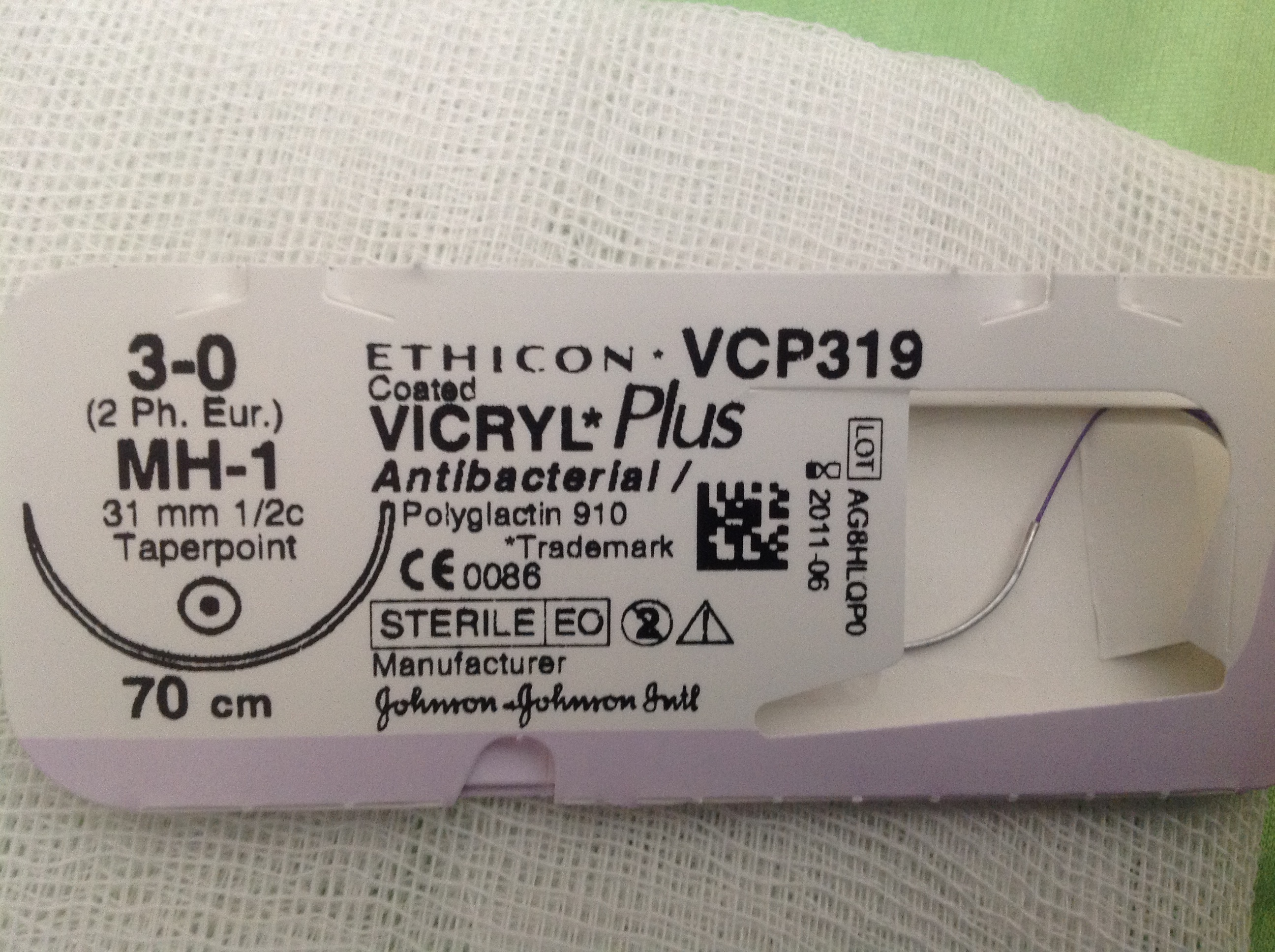
Lettering on Vicryl package

Vicryl (polyglactin 910) is an absorbable, synthetic, usually braided suture, manufactured by Ethicon Inc., a subsidiary of Johnson and Johnson. A monofilament version is also made for use in on eyes. It is used for soft tissue approximation and ligation. The suture holds its tensile strength for approximately two to three weeks in tissue and is completely absorbed by acid hydrolysis within 8-10 weeks. Vicryl and other polyglycolic-acid sutures may also be treated for more rapid breakdown ("Vicryl Rapide") in rapidly healing tissues such as mucous membrane or impregnated with triclosan ("Vicryl Plus Antibacterial") to provide antimicrobial protection of the suture line. Because Vicryl is slow-absorbing and often braided, its use is contraindicated in the closure of any cutaneous wound exposed to the air, as it draws moisture from the healing tissue to the skin and allows bacteria and irritants to migrate into the wound. This may lead to high reactivity to the contaminants, poor wound healing, and eventually infection.

Although the name "Vicryl" is a trademark of Ethicon, the term "vicryl" has been used generically referring to any synthetic absorbable suture made primarily of polyglycolic acid. Other brands of polyglycolic acid suture include PolySyn, Surgicryl, Polysorb, and Dexon, all of which are manufactured by different companies. Vicryl is a copolymer of lactide (a bislactone of lactic acid) and glycolide (a bislactone of glycolic acid). In practice, Vicryl comes braided, dyed or undyed with the following decay schedule: 75% at two weeks, 50% at three weeks, and 25% at four weeks (i.e., the sutures retain that proportion of tensile strength at those dates).
