= Johnson and Johnson Plaza =

Highrise building in New Brunswick, New Jersey, US

Johnson & Johnson Plaza
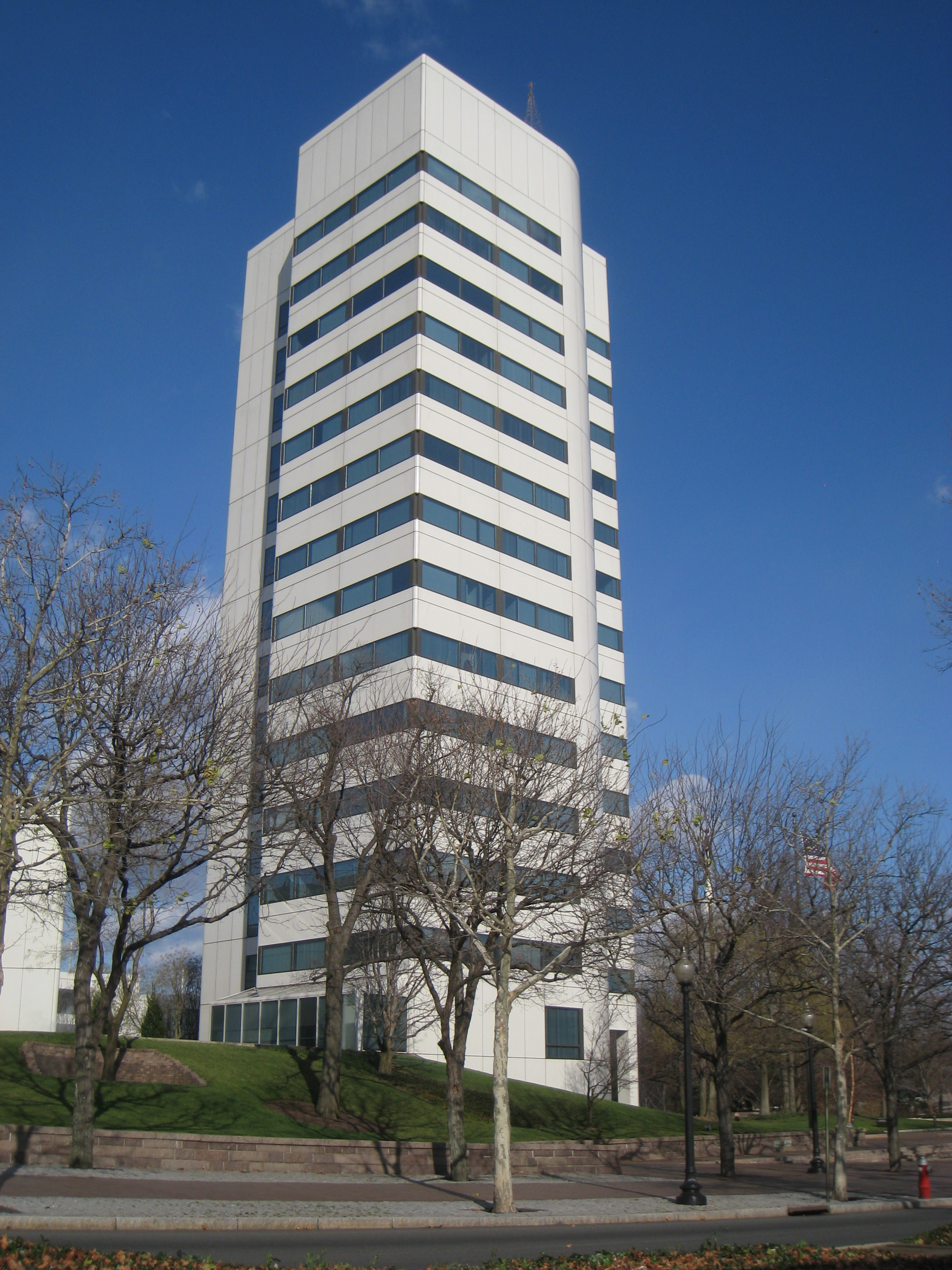
- Tower

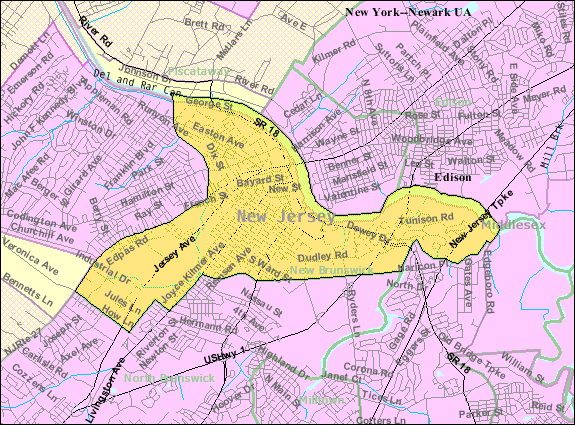
- Location within New Brunswick, NJ Location within New Jersey

General information
- Type: Mixed-use highrise
- Location: New Brunswick, New Jersey
- Coordinates: 40°29′52″N 74°26′34″W
- Construction started: 1979
- Completed: 1982
- Opening: 1983

Height
- Roof: 70 m (230 ft)

Technical details
- Floor count: 16

Design and construction
- Architects: Henry N. Cobb; Pei Cobb Freed & Partners
- Structural engineer: Weiskopf & Pickworth; Cosentini Associates

Johnson and Johnson Plaza is the world headquarters for Johnson & Johnson in New Brunswick, New Jersey. The 16-story building opened in 1983. Its construction is considered to represent the beginning of revitalization of the city's central business district.

== Design ==
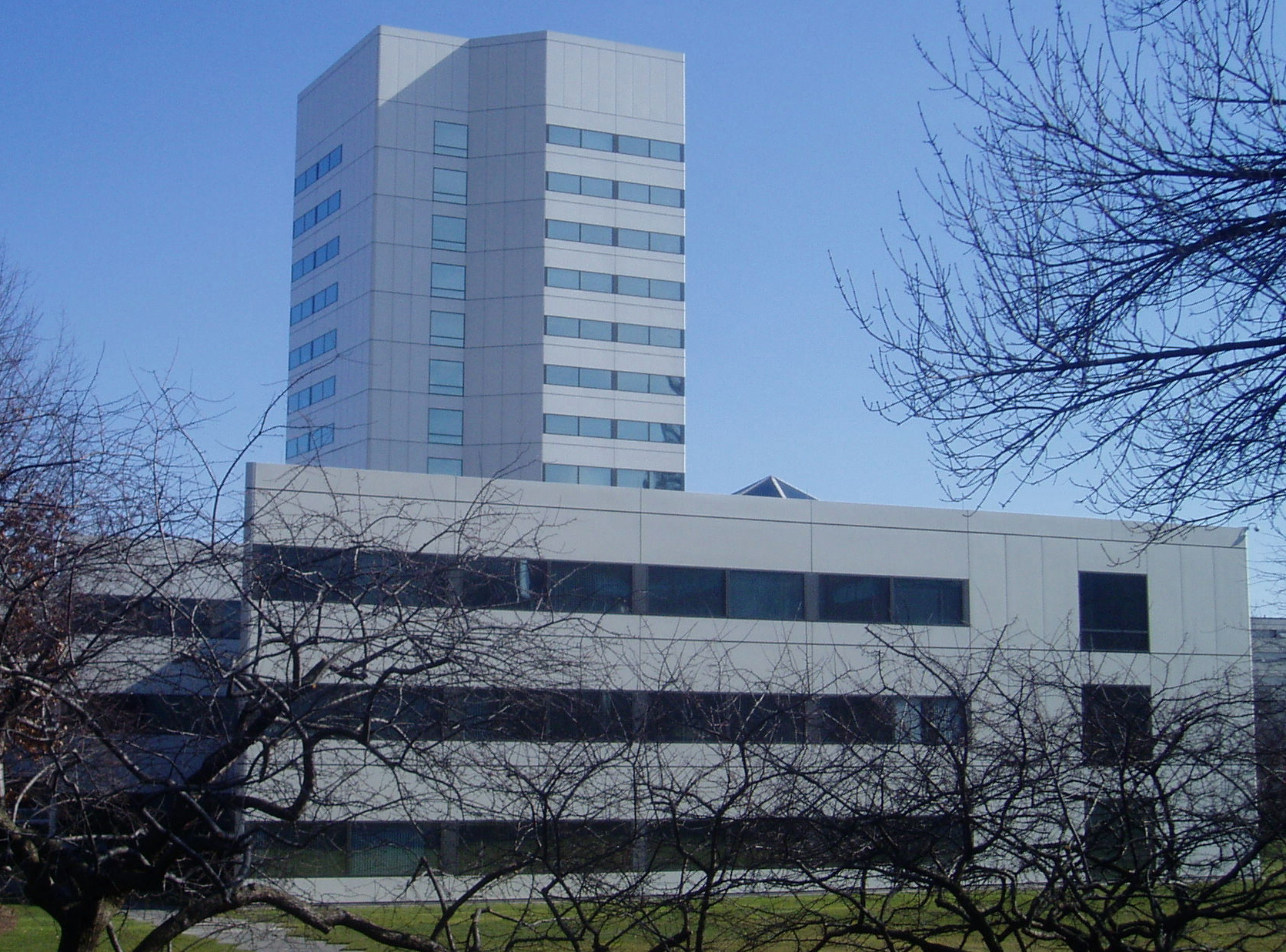

The complex is situated on a 12-acre downtown site and comprises a 16-story tower and seven connecting three-story modules sheathed in glass and white enameled aluminum. It was designed by Henry N. Cobb from Pei Cobb Freed & Partners. The white tower, one of tallest buildings in New Brunswick, and surrounding buildings in a park-like setting are across the Northeast Corridor.

The buildings were updated in the 2010s following a design by Kimmerle Newman Architects.

== History ==
The company had historically been located on the Delaware and Raritan Canal in New Brunswick. The company considered moving its headquarters out of New Brunswick in the 1960s, but decided to stay after city officials promised to revitalize downtown New Brunswick by demolishing old buildings and constructing new ones. The chairman of J&J at the time was instrumental in the plan. While New Brunswick lost many historic structures, including the early home of Rutgers University, and most of its historic commercial waterfront to the redevelopment effort, the gentrification did attract people back to New Brunswick. The stretch of Delaware and Raritan canal by the company's headquarters was replaced by a stretch of Route 18 in the late 1970s, after a lengthy dispute. I. M. Pei was involved in the plan.

== See also ==
- List of tallest buildings in New Brunswick, New Jersey
- List of I. M. Pei projects
