= World Trade Center Barcelona =

Convention center in Barcelona, Spain

Coordinates: 41°22′17″N 2°10′54″E

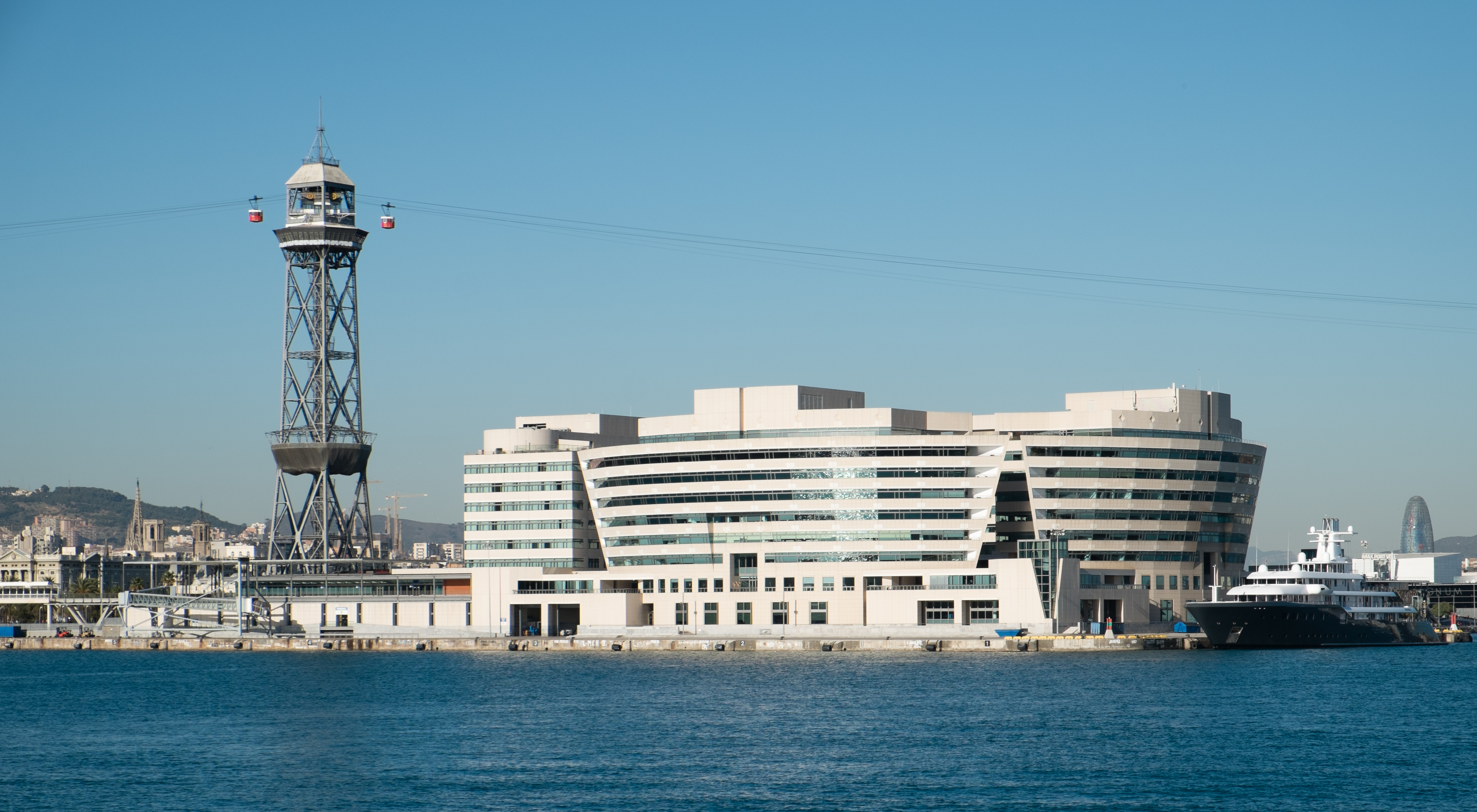
World Trade Center Barcelona

Wordmark

World Trade Center Barcelona is a business park located in Barcelona, opened on 22 July 1999. This business center is located on the waterfront close to the city center, and has 40,000 square meters (430,000 sq ft) of rented office and a conference center, conventions and meeting spaces with 20 different rooms.

WTCB building structure was inspired by the shape of a boat surrounded by the Mediterranean Sea, and created by American architect Henry N. Cobb. The arrangement of the four buildings in a circle creates a central plaza of 2,500 square meters (27,000 sq ft), where shops and restaurants provide services to the users of the complex. The four towers house offices for rent, a congress center and the Hotel Grand Marina.

Complex design allows renting offices from 40 to 3,000 square meters (430–32,290 sq ft) in a single plant. The flexibility of space is also a feature of the convention center, offering the possibility of organizing meetings of 8 to large events with up to 1,500 attendees.
