= Mentor Worldwide =

Mentor Worldwide LLC
- Company type: Subsidiary
- Industry: Medical equipment
- Founded: 1969; 57 years ago, in Minneapolis, Minnesota, US
- Headquarters: Santa Barbara, California, U.S.
- Key people: David J. Wilson (CEO); Edward S. Northup (COO); Michael O'Neill (CFO)
- Products: ContourProfile Gel breast implants MemoryGel breast implants NIA 24 skincare See complete products listing.
- Revenue: ▲$302 million USD (2007)
- Net income: ▲$57.6 million USD (2007)
- Number of employees: 2,000 (2007)
- Parent: Ethicon
- Website: mentorwwllc.com

Mentor Worldwide LLC is an American company that supplies surgical aesthetics products to plastic surgeons. The company is based in Santa Barbara, California and is part of Johnson & Johnson MedTech business segment. It produces one of two silicone gel breast implants. Titled MemoryGel, the product was approved by the U.S. Food and Drug Administration (FDA) on November 17, 2006. The other FDA-approved products are developed by competitors Allergan and Sientra. Mentor also produces a range of lipoplasty equipment for liposuction procedures as well as a Niacin-based skincare product line called NIA 24.

== History ==
Mentor Corporation was founded in Minneapolis, Minnesota in 1969 by Christopher Conway, Eugene Glover, and Thomas Hauser. Mentor went public in 1970 and its first product line consisted of electronic laboratory instruments for the detection and measurement of the electrical activity of nerve cells and neural systems. Special urethral catheters for the treatment of urinary retention were introduced in 1975.

After acquiring the Heyer-Schulte division of American Hospital Supply in 1984. Heyer Schulte manufactured implantable products. In 1985, Mentor moved its headquarters to Santa Barbara, California.

On Jan 23, 2009, Mentor was acquired by Johnson & Johnson, and is a stand-alone business unit reporting through Ethicon, Inc., a Johnson & Johnson company and provider of suture, mesh, hemostats, and other products for surgical procedures. Johnson & Johnson company markets its breast implant products in India with the name MentorConfidence.

== Notes and references ==
- “US FDA/CDRH: Breast Implants - Silicone Gel Implant Approvals (2006)” FDA
- “Mentor Corporation Official Web Site” Mentor Corporation http://www.mentorcorp.com/
- "Mentor Confidence" Indian official domain https://web.archive.org/web/20120319160528/http://www.mentorconfidence.com/
