= Guselkumab =

Monoclonal antibody

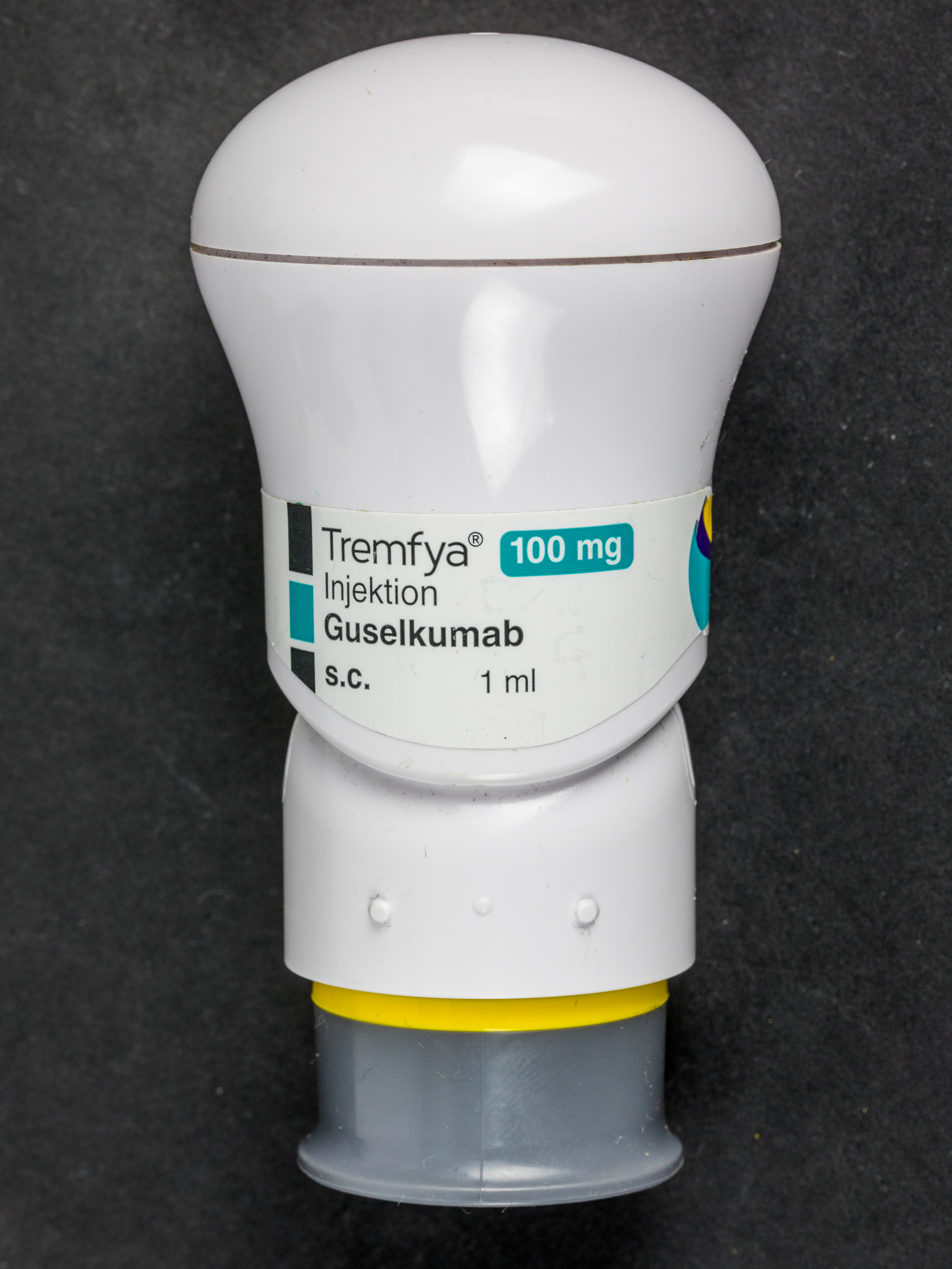
- A Tremfya bulb-style injection.

Monoclonal antibody
- Type: Whole antibody
- Source: Human
- Target: IL23

Clinical data
- Pronunciation: /ɡjuˈsɛlkjumæb/ gew-SEL-kew-mab
- Trade names: Tremfya
- AHFS/Drugs.com: Monograph
- MedlinePlus: a617036
- License data: US DailyMed: Guselkumab
- Pregnancy category: AU: B1
- Routes of administration: Subcutaneous, intravenous
- ATC code: L04AC16 (WHO)

Legal status
- Legal status: AU: S4 (Prescription only); CA: Rx-only, Schedule D; UK: POM (Prescription only); US: ℞-only; EU: Rx-only

Identifiers
- CAS Number: 1350289-85-8
- DrugBank: DB11834
- ChemSpider: none
- UNII: 089658A12D
- KEGG: D10438

Chemical and physical data
- Formula: C_{6402}H_{9864}N_{1676}O_{1994}S_{42}
- Molar mass: 143561.59 g·mol^{−1}

Guselkumab (/ɡjuˈsɛlkjumæb/ gew-SEL-kew-mab; sold under the brand name Tremfya) is a human monoclonal antibody against interleukin-23 used for the treatment of plaque psoriasis, psoriatic arthritis, ulcerative colitis, and Crohn's disease.

== Medical uses ==
Guselkumab is indicated to treat plaque psoriasis, psoriatic arthritis, ulcerative colitis, and Crohn's disease.

== Adverse effects ==
The most common side effects for guselkumab are upper respiratory tract infections, headache, injection site reactions, joint pain, diarrhea, gastroenteritis, fungal skin infections and herpes simplex infections.

== Pharmacology ==
=== Mechanism of action ===
Guselkumab targets the IL-23 subunit alpha (p19 subunit) preventing it from binding to cell receptors that would otherwise be activated by its presence.

=== Pharmacokinetics ===
- C_{max} 8.09 μg/mL
- t_{max} 5.5 days
- volume of distribution 13.5 L
- apparent clearance 0.516 L/day

== History ==
Guselkumab was developed by Janssen Pharmaceuticals. In November 2016, Janssen submitted a Biologics License Application (BLA) to the US Food and Drug Administration (FDA) seeking approval of guselkumab.

== Society and culture ==
=== Legal status ===
In July 2017, the US Food and Drug Administration (FDA) approved guselkumab for the treatment of plaque psoriasis.

In November 2017, Health Canada approved guselkumab for the treatment of plaque psoriasis. In September 2020, the approval was expanded to include the treatment of adults with psoriatic arthritis.

In April 2018, guselkumab was approved in Japan for the treatment of psoriatic arthritis.

In July 2020, the FDA approved guselkumab as the first IL-23 inhibitor to treat active psoriatic arthritis (PsA).

In September 2024, the FDA approved guselkumab for the treatment of moderately to severely active ulcerative colitis in adults.

In May 2025, the UK Medicines and Healthcare products Regulatory Agency approved guselkumab for Crohn's disease and ulcerative colitis.

=== Economics ===
The list price of each 100 mg dose is about US$14,000.

=== Names ===
During development, guselkumab was referred to as CNTO-1959.

== Research ==
Guselkumab has undergone phase III clinical trials comparing it with adalimumab (Humira) and ustekinumab (Stelara).

The safety and efficacy of guselkumab was compared to a placebo and to adalimumab in the "VOYAGE 1" and "VOYAGE 2" phase III clinical trials (ClinicalTrials.gov IDs: NCT02207231 and NCT02207244). Preliminary results indicated that a significantly higher proportion of patients taking guselkumab had better skin clearance compared to those taking the other treatments. At week 16, 73.3% of patients taking guselkumab achieved a PASI 90 (90% reduction in PASI score from baseline), vs 49.7% of those taking adalimumab; additionally, 91.2% of patients taking guselkumab achieved a PASI 75 (75% reduction in PASI score from baseline), vs 73.1% of those taking adalimumab.

The phase III clinical trial "NAVIGATE" (ClinicalTrials.gov ID: NCT02203032) included only patients who had poor responses to treatment with ustekinumab. It showed that patients who switched to guselkumab from ustekinumab did better than those who remained on ustekinumab.
