= William C. Weldon =

American businessman

William C. Weldon (born November 26, 1948) is a former chairman of Johnson & Johnson. He was the eighth chairman in Johnson & Johnson's history of more than one hundred years.

== Early life and education ==
Weldon was born in Brooklyn, New York. His parents were a Broadway stagehand and a costume designer. He received a Bachelor of Arts degree in biology from Quinnipiac University in 1971.

== Career ==
Weldon joined Johnson & Johnson as a sales representative for the McNeil Pharmaceutical division in 1971 and eventually became the head of Johnson & Johnson's Ethicon Endo-Surgery business in 1992. He became the head of Johnson & Johnson's pharmaceutical operations in 1998 and then became the company's chief executive officer (CEO) in 2002. As CEO, Weldon engineered some of the largest acquisitions in the company's history including the purchase of Alza and Pfizer's consumer-health product line.

In 2011, The New York Times named him on its list of "The Worst C.E.O.'s of 2011" for the increased number of Johnson & Johnson product recalls under his leadership. Additionally, as of 2013, his story was a case study at the Leadership & Corporate Accountability course at Harvard Business School.

In Weldon's first full year as the company's CEO, total revenues increased from $32.3 billion to $36.3 billion and net earnings from $5.7 billion to $6.6 billion. In 2011, his last full year as CEO, revenues were $44.7 billion and net earnings were $9.7 billion.

Weldon retired as chairman of Johnson & Johnson on December 28, 2012, and was reported to receive $143.5 million in retirement pay.

=== Board memberships ===
He also sits on the JPMorgan Chase & Co. board of directors, the HeartFlow board of directors, the ExxonMobil board of directors, the Fairfax Financial board of directors, and the Quinnipiac University board of trustees.
