= TearScience =

TearScience is an American company founded in 2005 that develops, manufactures and markets ophthalmic medical devices aiding in the identification and treatment of meibomian gland dysfunction, which can lead to dry eye disease, which is a condition that affect as many as 25 million Americans. The company's Lipiflow System was FDA cleared in June 2011 for treating meibomian gland dysfunction and is currently installed in over 250 locations across the globe. The company is headquartered in Morrisville, North Carolina.

== Products ==
LipiView Ocular Surface uses interferometry to measure the thickness of the tear film oily lipid layer. LipiFlow Thermal Pulsation System uses heat and pressure to unblock obstructed meibomian glands to reduce dry eye symptoms.
