= Ethicon =

Pharmaceutical company

Ethicon, Inc.
- Formerly: G.F.Mersons Limited, Ethicon Suture Laboratories
- Type: Subsidiary
- Industry: Surgical systems and instruments
- Founded: 1915; 111 years ago, in Edinburgh, Scotland
- Founder: George F. Merson
- Headquarters: Raritan, New Jersey and Cincinnati, Ohio
- Area served: Worldwide
- Key people: Michael Del Prado (chairman); Andrew Ekdahl (president)
- Products: Prolene, Monocryl, Vicryl, Ethilon, Gynecare
- Revenue: $4.87 billion (sales) (2011)
- Number of employees: 11,000
- Parent: Johnson & Johnson
- Website: ethicon.com

Ethicon, Inc., is a subsidiary of Johnson & Johnson. The company is part of the Johnson & Johnson MedTech business segment. It was incorporated as a separate company under the Johnson & Johnson umbrella in 1949 to expand and diversify the Johnson & Johnson product line.

Ethicon has manufactured surgical sutures and wound closure devices since 1887. After World War II, Ethicon's market share in surgical sutures rose from 15% to 70% worldwide. In the United States, the market share is approximately 80%.

Ethicon conducts business in 52 countries.

== Corporate history ==
In 1915, George F. Merson opened a facility in Edinburgh for the manufacturing, packaging and sterilising of catgut, silk and nylon sutures. Johnson & Johnson acquired Mr. Merson's company in 1947, and this was renamed Ethicon Suture Laboratories. In 1953 this became Ethicon Inc.

=== Radiation sterilization ===
Beginning in 1956, sutures manufactured by Ethicon became the first commercial medical devices to be radio-sterilized, marking a advancement over heat sterilization methods that adversely affected product quality and restricted packaging material choices. Charles Artandi, who joined Ethicon in 1953, led the development of reliable radiation sterilization techniques and produced foundational research on the effects of radiation on over one hundred different types of microorganisms, suture materials, and various packaging materials. In 1959, Artandi and Walton Van Winkle established that a dose of 25 kGy was 40% above the minimum required to eliminate the most resistant microorganisms, a standard that became accepted for medical device sterilization.

Ethicon purchased a microwave linear accelerator from High Voltage Engineering Corporation in 1957 for electron-beam sterilization. The company transitioned to gamma irradiation in 1960 due to the electron beam's limited penetration and machine reliability issues. In 1961, following competitive bidding, Ethicon selected Atomic Energy of Canada Limited to supply a gamma irradiator for its Somerville, New Jersey facility, which became operational in 1964. That same year, additional gamma irradiators were constructed in San Angelo, Texas and Peterborough, Ontario, followed by facilities in San Angelo and Slough, England before 1965. The Somerville facility became an international center for radiation sterilization research, and in 1978 Artandi was named the "Father of Irradiation Sterilisation," receiving both the Johnson Medal for Research and Development and the American Nuclear Society's Radiation Industry Award for his contributions to the field.

In 1992, Ethicon was restructured, and Ethicon Endo-Surgery became a separate corporate entity.

In 2008, Ethicon sold its wound management business to One Equity Partners and became Systagenix Wound Management Limited.

In 2009, Ethicon acquired breast implant maker Mentor, and in 2010 it acquired ear, nose and throat technology company Acclarent. In 2016, Ethicon acquired NeuWave Medical.

In 2013, J&J merged Ethicon Endo-Surgery back into Ethicon.

As of September 10, 2024, Ethicon began operating under the name Johnson & Johnson MedTech.

=== Physiomesh class action lawsuits ===
On June 13, 2016, Health Canada issued a recall of Ethicon's Physiomesh Flexible Composite Mesh Product used for ventral hernia repair. The product had been on the Canadian market since September 2010 and patients claimed a range of complications following surgery. The proposed Canadian class action, filed June 1, 2017 is seeking court approval for certification as a class action and is expected to proceed in 2019.

=== Gynecare Prolift controversy ===
There is some controversy around Ethicon's transvaginal meshes used on patients with female genital prolapse.

Ethicon's Gynecare Prolift, was introduced in March 2005, bypassing FDA review. The company felt its basic polypropylene had already been approved and therefore it did not need to reapply for clearance for its Prolift kit. Three years later, when Ethicon tried to obtain clearance for its Prolift +M, the FDA was alerted to the fact that Prolift had been on the market. The agency approved the Prolift and Prolift +M with no penalty. Both were cleared through the Food and Drug Administrations 510(k) clearance process, that is clearance to sell. Ethicon's parent company Johnson & Johnson utilized the FDA's 510(k) clearance method, which allows a product to be sold without official FDA approval if it is based on another already approved product. However, in 2008, the FDA issued a Public Health Notification regarding reports of serious complications associated with transvaginal mesh devices. This escalated in 2011 when the agency received more than 1,000 adverse effect reports from surgical mesh manufacturers. The FDA decided to order Ethicon and other transvaginal mesh manufacturers to cease production until extensive testing and research on each of vaginal mesh device was conducted. In June 2012, following the FDA's order for additional testing, Johnson & Johnson permanently removed all Prolift products from the market.

In one court case reported by Reuters, the plaintiff, Dianne Bellew, who had been implanted with the product in 2009, said she was never warned about how the device could contract and erode, causing pain and scarring.
