= Ellis D Fogg =

- Born: Cairns, Queensland, Australia
- Education: Newington College, Sydney, New South Wales
- Occupations: Lumino kinetic sculptor, lighting designer
- Website: fogg.com.au

Roger Foley-Fogg, formerly known by the pseudonym Ellis D Fogg and later by his name Roger Foley, is an Australian artist, lighting designer, and lumino kinetic artist.

== Early life and education ==
Roger Foley was born in Cairns, Queensland, and attended Newington College in Sydney(1957–1959).

In the late 1950s he was encouraged by his mother to expand his interest in art, attending Joy and Betty Rainer's art and craft classes in Mosman, experimenting with light and shadow through bathroom glass and with light diffracted through the leaves of trees. His nickname at school was Fogg, he thinks derived from his "ethereal way of pondering things".

== Career ==
In the 1960s he started designing rock concerts and psychedelic light shows. Producer and promoter John Pinder arranged his first lightshow / concert in Melbourne, "The Electric Blues Thing" featuring Doug Parkinson in Focus, and The Semblence of Dignity, with Fogg providing the "psychedelic lightshow", at the Carlton Cinema in 1968.

His experimental light shows incorporating his Light Sculpture – Lumino Kinetic sculpture through to the 1970s were precursors to present multi-media installation.

=== Yellow House ===
Foley was one of a group of artists who worked and exhibited at the Yellow House Artist Collective in Potts Point. The Yellow House was founded by artist Martin Sharp, and between 1970 and 1973 was a piece of living art and a mecca to pop art. The canvas was the house itself and almost every wall, floor, and ceiling became part of the gallery. Many well-known artists, including George Gittoes, Brett Whiteley, Peter Kingston, Albie Thoms, and Greg Weight, helped to create the multi-media performance art space that may have been Australia's first 24-hour-a-day happening.

=== Recent work ===
In 2022 Foley Fogg was engaged to produce Lightshows for Byron Bay Bluesfest 2022 and for Nimbin Roots Festival 2022.

== Recognition ==
Albie Thoms, founder of rival lightshow group UBU, said "Fogg is later recognised as Sydney's leading lightshow artist".

The National Film and Sound Archive has described him as Australia's "most innovative lighting designer and lumino kinetic sculptor". (Note: The term "lumino kinetic art" was first used in 1966 by Frank Popper, Professor of Aesthetics at the University of Paris.)
