= Festa Italiana (disambiguation) =

Festa Italiana may refer to:

- Festa Italiana in Portland, Oregon
- Festa Italiana in Seattle, Washington
- Festa Italiana in Virginia Beach, Virginia
- Festa Italiana in Milwaukee, Wisconsin
