= Artist Profile =

Contemporary art magazine

- Discipline: Art
- Language: English
- Edited by: Kon Gouriotis OAM

Publication details
- History: 2007–present
- Publisher: Bandicoot Publishing Pty Ltd (Australia)
- Frequency: Quarterly

Standard abbreviations
- ISO 4: Artist Profile

Indexing
- ISSN: 1834-7940

Links
- Journal homepage

Artist Profile is an international quarterly contemporary art magazine published in Sydney, Australia.

== History and profile ==
Founded in 2007, Artist Profile is released four times a year and distributed across Australia, Oceania, North America, Southeast Asia and South Africa. It features exclusive studio interviews and photographic profiles of Australian and international artists, as well as essays by artists, scholars and curators; artist projects; exhibition reviews; and information on books, films, fairs, biennials and contemporary art festivals with a concentration on Australia and the Asia-Pacific region. The magazine was founded by editor Paul Flynn and originally published by nextmedia. Since 2015, it has been edited by Kon Gouriotis OAM and is now published by Bandicoot Publishing.

Artist Profile also sponsors and manages artist expeditions, public programs, exhibitions and other arts projects to foster appreciation of the arts, working in tandem with the magazine, to make the creative output of talented artists available to collectors, industry professionals, educators and other artists.

In 2012, Artist Profile was the official media partner to the Melbourne Art Fair as well as a contributing partner to the 18th Biennale of Sydney.

== Notable interviewees ==
- Ai Weiwei
- Bill Viola
- Olafur Eliasson
- Hiroshi Sugimoto
- Enrique Martínez Celaya
- Pieter Hugo
- Adrian Ghenie
- Jitish Kallat
- Patty Chang
- Hernan Bas
- James Gleeson
- Elisabeth Cummings
- Euan Macleod
- Iñigo Manglano-Ovalle
- Louise Hearman
- Brook Andrew
- Rick Amor
- Spencer Finch
- George Gittoes
- Bonita Ely
- Shen Shaomin
- Vivienne Binns
- Del Kathryn Barton
- Sam Leach
- John Olsen (Australian artist)
- Guo Jian
