= Oh My Rosemary =

Polish soldier's song

Oh My Rosemary (Polish: O mój rozmarynie) was one of the most popular Polish soldier songs from time of First World War and its aftermath conflicts like the Polish-Soviet War. It was found in nearly all of the contemporary song collections. There is no uniform text, as there were several variations.

The text of the song is a variation of older folksongs of unknown authorship, and there were records of the more common version being known at least in 1913. The most common version of the war time has been attributed to, or perhaps simply written down and published (in 1915), by the poet Edward Słoński. Another poet credited with at least partial authorship (likely of the last three segments) was Wacław Denhoff-Czarnocki. Music has been composed by Zygmunt Pomarański. All three of them were members of the Polish Legions in World War I.

== Lyrics ==
Polish	English translation
O mój rozmarynie, rozwijaj się Pójdę do dziewczyny, pójdę do jedynej Zapytam się.	Blossom, oh my rosemary I'll visit the girl, I'll visit the only one I'll ask her.
A jak mi odpowie – nie kocham cię, Ułani werbują, strzelcy maszerują Zaciągnę się.	And if she tells me she doesn't love me Uhlans are recruiting, riflemen are marching I'll enlist.
Dadzą mi konika cisawego I ostrą szabelkę, i ostrą szabelkę Do boku mego.	They'll give me a bay horse And a sharp sabre, and a sharp sabre For me to carry.
Dadzą mi kabacik z wyłogami I wysokie buty, i wysokie buty Z ostrogami.	They'll give me an overcoat And high boots, and high boots With spurs.
Dadzą mi uniform popielaty Ażebym nie tęsknił, ażebym nie tęsknił Do swej chaty.	They'll give me an uniform in dark grey So that I don't long for, so that I don't long for My home.
Dadzą mi manierkę z gorzałczyną Ażebym nie tęsknił, ażebym nie tęsknił Za dziewczyną.	They'll give me a canteen full of vodka So that I don't long for, so that I don't long for The girl.
Dadzą mi szkaplerzyk z Matką Boską; Żeby mnie broniła, żeby mnie broniła Tam pod Moskwą.	They'll give me a medallion with Holy Mary; For her to protect me, for her to protect me Far away near Moscow.
Powiodą z okopów na bagnety, Bagnet mnie ukłuje, śmierć mnie pocałuje, Ale nie ty.	They'll lead us out of trenches, with bayonets fixed Bayonet will sting me, death will kiss me But not you.
