= Battle Music =

In musical genre, battle music may refer to:

- Battle music (video game music), a type of video game music
- Battle music (heavy metal music), a type of heavy metal music
- Battle music, an imitative compositional style found in Renaissance music
