= Weather Machine =

Lumino kinetic bronze sculpture and weather beacon in Portland, Oregon

- The sculpture predicting a clear day in 2007
- Interactive map of Weather Machine
- Location: Pioneer Courthouse Square, Portland, Oregon, US
- Coordinates: 45.5190°N 122.6793°W
- Designer: Omen Design Group Inc.
- Type: Bronze sculpture
- Material: Bronze, stainless steel
- Height: 25 to 33 ft (7.6 to 10.1 m)
- Beginning date: c. 1983
- Completion date: August 1988
- Opening date: August 24, 1988

Weather Machine is a lumino kinetic bronze sculpture and columnar machine that serves as a weather beacon, displaying a weather prediction each day at noon. Designed and constructed by Omen Design Group Inc., the approximately 30-foot-tall (9 m) sculpture was installed in 1988 in a corner of Pioneer Courthouse Square in Portland, Oregon, United States. Two thousand people attended its dedication, which was broadcast live nationally from the square by Today weatherman Willard Scott. The machine costs $60,000.

During its daily two-minute sequence, which includes a trumpet fanfare, mist, and flashing lights, the machine displays one of three metal symbols as a prediction of the weather for the following 24-hour period: a sun for clear and sunny weather, a blue heron for drizzle and transitional weather, or a dragon and mist for rainy or stormy weather. The sculpture includes two bronze wind scoops and displays the temperature via colored lights along its stem. The air quality index is also displayed by a light system below the stainless steel globe. Weather predictions are made based on information obtained by employees of Pioneer Courthouse Square from the National Weather Service and the Department of Environmental Quality. Considered a tourist attraction, Weather Machine has been praised for its quirkiness, and has been compared to a giant scepter.

== Description and history ==
Weather Machine is a lumino kinetic bronze sculpture that serves as a weather beacon, designed and constructed by Omen Design Group Inc. Contributors included Jere and Ray Grimm, Dick Ponzi, who won a 40-entry international competition to design the machine for Pioneer Courthouse Square (1984), and Roger Patrick Sheppard. The group described their efforts as "collaborative", but Sheppard considered Ponzi the "maestro" of the project. Ponzi did the engineering and hydraulics, and the machine was assembled at his vineyard near Beaverton. The sculpture was inspired by Portland-born-and-based writer Terence O'Donnell, who suffered from osteomyelitis during his childhood, and his "funny Irish jig". Weather Machine, which took five years to plan and build and cost $60,000, was installed in the square in August 1988. Today weatherman Willard Scott broadcast live from the square to dedicate the sculpture on its August 24 opening. Two thousand people were present as early as 4 a.m. for the dedication. Financial contributors included Pete and Mary Mark, the AT&T Foundation, Alyce R. Cheatham, Alexandra MacColl, E. Kimbark MacColl, Meier & Frank, the Oregon Department of Environmental Quality, David Pugh and Standard Insurance Company. Information about the donors was included on a plaque added to the sculpture's stem in the weeks following the dedication.

The sculpture includes two bronze wind scoops. Pictured is the blue heron symbol, which indicates transitional weather.

Each day at noon, the columnar machine performs a two-minute sequence that begins with a trumpet fanfare of the opening bars of Aaron Copland's Fanfare for the Common Man, and produces mist and flashing lights. It eventually reveals one of three metal symbols: a stylized golden sun ("helia") for clear and sunny weather, a blue heron (Portland's official bird) for drizzle and transitional weather, or mist and a "fierce, open-mouthed" dragon for heavy rain or stormy weather. The fanciful symbols change at the same time every day, representing weather predictions for the following 24-hour period. "Helia", described as "gleaming", was designed by Jere Grimm; her design would later be applied to one of her husband's pots, exhibited in 1989. The trumpets are allowed to play at noon due to a waiver of Portland's noise ordinance for that time period. Ray Grimm constructed the blue heron symbol, and the group collaborated on the dragon symbol based on his drawings. In order for the machine to display an accurate weather prediction, as reported by The Oregonian in 1988, employees of Pioneer Courthouse Square contact the National Weather Service each morning at 10:30 a.m. for the forecast, and then enter information into the machine's computer, located behind a nearby door.

The machine, whose height is reported to be between 25 and 33 feet (7.6 and 10.1 m), includes two bronze wind scoops that turn in opposite directions. It also indicates the temperature (when 20 °F (−7 °C) or above) via vertical colored lights along the sculpture's stem. Measured by an internal gauge, the machine displays blue lights for temperatures below freezing, white lights for above freezing and red lights to mark every ten degrees (°F). Referring to an additional light system (below the stainless steel globe) that indicates air quality, The Oregonian reported in 1988 that a green light indicates good air quality, amber reflects "semismoggy" air and a red light indicates poor air quality. However, in 1998, one writer for The Oregonian warned: "you don't want to breathe so much when the white light is on". Pioneer Courthouse Square employees enter air quality information into the machine's computer following routine checks with the Department of Environmental Quality.

In addition to its pre-dawn dedication on national television, Weather Machine had a public dedication at noon on August 24, attended by Mayor Bud Clark and other city officials. On that day, the machine displayed the sun symbol and a green light for good air quality, and indicated a temperature of 82 °F (28 °C). Following the fanfare, known officially as "Fanfare for Weather Machine with Four Trumpets", jazz singer Shirley Nanette led the crowd in a rendition of "You Are My Sunshine". Portland had good weather in the days following its dedication, preventing visitors from seeing all three symbols for an extended length of time (though all three symbols are displayed briefly during the daily two-minute sequence). This prompted the executive director of Pioneer Courthouse Square to consider altering the machine's schedule so that the public would have a chance to see all three symbols. The sculpture maintained good operation until winter 1995, when its mechanical performance temporarily began deviating away from noon and the temperature gauge had difficulties working properly. In 2012, the machine malfunctioned and stopped operating for about a week.

== Reception ==
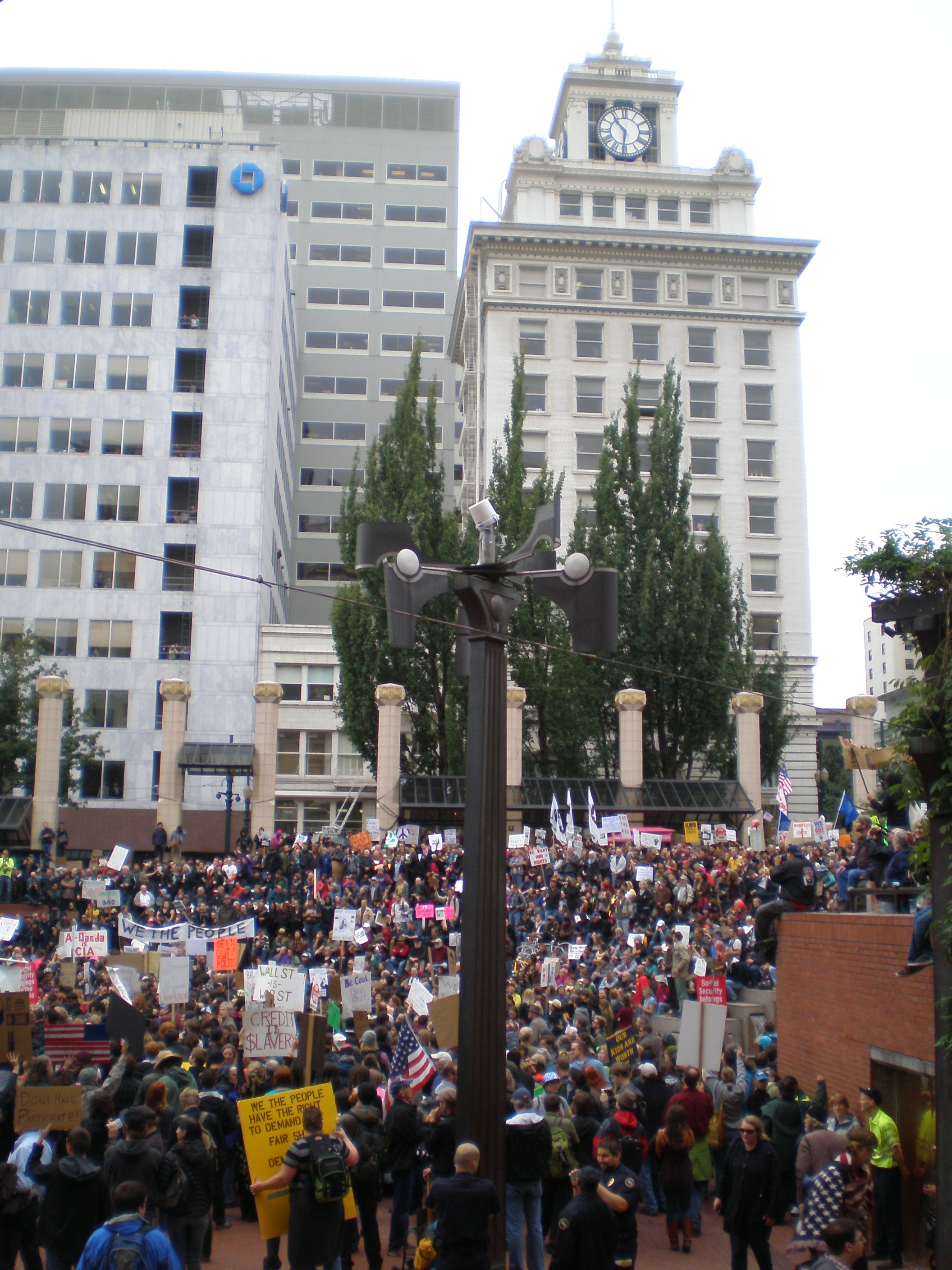
The sculpture, from the north, during an Occupy Portland protest in 2011

In the weeks following Weather Machine's dedication, an estimated 300 to 400 people gathered at the square daily to witness the noon sequence. Following the dedication, The Oregonian wrote: "It takes nothing from its fascination to know that a human on the staff of the square will be making the daily phone calls to the Weather Service and the Department of Environmental Quality, and pushing the necessary buttons to cue the pillar's performance ... They have given Portland an attraction no other city has. We're going to like it."

Ponzi described the machine as "light-hearted ... active, distinctive—and fun". O'Donnell, who inspired the sculpture, called it a "gentle spectacle" and described the work as "a cartoon contraption, an odd little thingamajig. It has bells and whistles and other mechanized wonders that confirm rain sometime after the downpour and proudly announce sunshine in the bright light of day." In 1994, The Oregonian reported that O'Donnell regarded Weather Machine with a "mixture of wonder and embarrassment" and stated that he "[didn't] think it [was] all that attractive". The publication's Vivian McInerny said of O'Donnell and the machine: "Practical people may wonder why the square needs such a silly weather machine when a glance out the window works as well .... And these practical people may be the very ones who make the world go 'round. But it is the less practical people, the dreamers like O'Donnell, who make it worth going 'round."

In 1995, The Oregonian's Jonathan Nicholas wrote, "To this day, nobody is exactly sure what happens when the thing sounds off each day at noon. It's like having a governor in blue jeans. We can't really explain it: It just happens." Grant Butler of The Oregonian gave the machine's trumpet fanfare as one of three examples of ways in which people could be certain it was noon in Portland.

The machine is considered a tourist attraction, recommended in visitor guides for Portland and included in walking tours. One travel contributor recommended a visit to the sculpture for people with children seeking a "perfect family day". Weather Machine has been compared to a giant scepter and has been called "bizarre", "eccentric", "playful", "unique", "wacky", "whimsical", "zany", and a "piece of wizardry".

== See also ==
- 1988 in art
- Allow Me, a bronze sculpture also located in Pioneer Courthouse Square
