= Yellow House Artist Collective =

Australian artists' collective

The Yellow House at 57–59 Macleay Street, Potts Point, was an artists' collective that began as an exhibition space for Martin Sharp's Art named THE MARTIN SHARP GALLERY in 1970. After Albie Thoms and Martin discussed the possibility of expanding the concept it was decided to add many other artists works and films and performances directed by Albie and a school The Ginger Meggs School of Arts and rename the gallery THE YELLOW HOUSE from 1971 through to the beginning of 1973 when Martin left.in Sydney, Australia. Many other younger artists and performers kept the YH going for another year when an unpaid electricity bill forced the closure. Despite controversies between artists about who was there and what they did Martin Sharp acknowledged that Albie was a prime mover. Albie Thoms expanded the facility and opened it as THE YELLOW HOUSE in 1971 to incorporate input from a variety of artists and performers. They modelled it on Vincent van Gogh's Yellow House at Arles and the Dutch artist's partially realised dream of establishing an artists' community there. The British Arts Lab movement of the late 1960s was also an influence on Sharp, who was resident in London between 1966-9.

Many well-known artists contributed to the multi-media performance art space that may have been Australia's first 24-hour-a-day ‘happening’. The canvas was the house itself and almost every wall, floor and ceiling became part of the gallery and performance space. The rooms of the house were inspired by Pop Art, Surrealism, Dada and Conceptualism. Overseas visitors to the Yellow House included members of the rock band Pink Floyd, Marty Feldman and David Litvinoff.

Apart from the exhibition of painting, drawing, sculpture and photography, there was also a puppet theatre, light shows, performance of plays and regular screening of films. These included a range of classic, avant-garde and modern works such Luis Buñuel and Salvador Dalí's Un Chien Andalou, Fritz Lang's Metropolis, Phil Noyce's Better to Reign in Hell, Leni Riefenstahl's Olympia and Peter Weir's Count Vim's Last Exercise, as well as works by Albie Thoms, Bruce Petty, Mick Glasheen and Arthur and Corinne Cantrill.

In 1990 the Art Gallery of New South Wales staged an exhibition which comprised, in part, reconstruction of some of the rooms from the Yellow House. A retrospective history of the Yellow House was compiled by Johanna Mendelson in association with the exhibition. The original building survives, though it now houses a mix of residential and commercial development, including the Yellow restaurant.

== Notable members ==
- Martin Sharp
- George Gittoes
- Brett Whiteley
- Ellis D Fogg
- Albie Thoms
- Greg Weight
- Peter Weir
- Richard Weight
- Bruce Goold
- Antoinette Starkiewicz
- Peter Kingston
- Mick Glasheen
- David Litvinoff
- Tim Burns
- Jon Lewis
- Peter Royles
- Tim Lewis
- Peter Wright
