= Greg Weight =

Australian photographer and writer

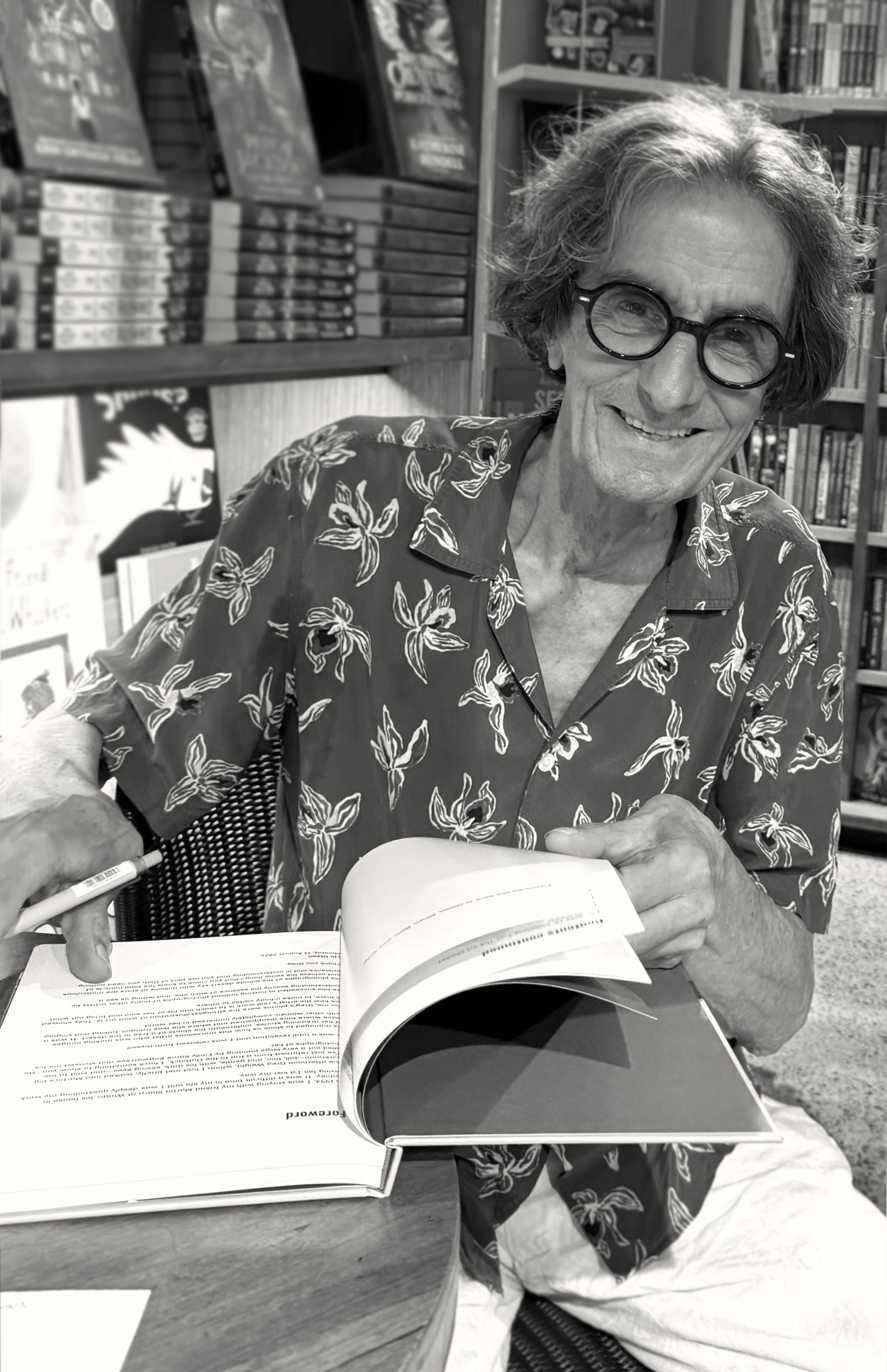
Greg Weight, signing books in Sydney, 2025.

Greg Weight (born 2 December 1946 in Sydney, Australia) is a notable Australian photographer whose works are held in Australian national and state collections, and appear in significant exhibitions or publications. He was a founding member of the Yellow House artist's collective in 1971. Weight specialises in fine art photography and portraiture. He has received multiple awards and is known for documenting leading figures in the Australian art world.

Weight was the inaugural winner of the Australian Photographic Portrait Prize in 2003 and his book Australian Artists, portraits by Greg Weight was published by Chapter and Verse in 2004. His memoir Exposure A photographic memoir was written during a ten-year period and released in 2025 by Piper Press. In addition to his work photographing many of Australia's artists and their works since the 1970s, Greg Weight produces landscapes, night skies, interiors, and paintographs - works which are printed with permanent pigment onto canvas and overpainted with oil paint.

He is the only photographer represented by Australian Galleries, since 2004.

== Early life ==
Greg Weight was born in Sydney to Lofty and Phyllis Weight, and grew up in the northern beaches suburb of Dee Why. His father was a wool trader and older siblings Diana Webber (married name) and Richard (Dick) went to the National Art School. Diana Webber's Bondi Beach sculpture of a surf lifesaver is an iconic bronze work commissioned in 1988.

Weight's great-grandfather was William Bird Herapath was the inventor of Herapathite, the crystals that became the basis of polaroid lenses used in spectacles and photographic lenses.

== Career ==
After graduating from high school he was introduced to the Sydney Push movement and art scene and began working at John Clemenger Advertising in 1963. At The George pub, he met Peter 'Charlie' Brown an art history lecturer, who suggested he work for artist Martin Sharp. As assistant to Martin Sharp, we worked in Sharp's studio for a year, in 1964. Sharp had decided to go to London, and Weight joined the studio of English photographer Alan Nye where he learnt studio photography for fashion and interiors. However, Nye was a volatile character with a difficult past, and Weight moved on after two years.

He opened his own studio and by 1966 was photographing fashion, interiors for Sydney clients. In 1969 Martin Sharp returned from London and made contact with Weight, discussing his ideas for the Yellow House artist collective he wanted to create. He took part in the first exhibition and became a regular member of the Yellow House with Brett Whiteley, George Gittoes, Albie Thoms, Peter Kingston, Bruce Goold, Nell Campbell, Dick Weight, Julia Sales and David Litvinoff.

Weight's prominence rose when he became the preferred photographer for artists and their works. First for Brett Whiteley in the 1970s, where he documented his works as well as took now-famous portraits. This was followed by portraits of painter John Olsen, Lloyd Rees, Jonny Bell, sculptor Robert Klippel and many others while developing his own practice and exhibiting works. He was the first photographer to document the work of Emily Kame Kngwarreye and took several important portraits of the First Nation's artist in 1995. He was the main photographer for the works of Margaret Olley later in her life, and was one of the last to see her alive, having been photographing her works at the time. He writes about these experiences in his memoir, explaining the relationships he maintained with these and other artists. His works relating to Margaret Olley's studio have been shown at Tweed Regional Gallery & Margaret Olley Art Centre.

To support his work through his career, he was a tertiary photography teacher and undertook ongoing studio commissions, portraits, residencies and exhibitions. In the 2000s, Weight moved to digital photography and has since developed works centred on the Australian desert, visiting Central Australia regularly with second wife, fellow artist, Carol Ruff. He has four children with his first wife and several grand children.

== Recognition ==
In 2003, Greg Weight won the Citigroup Australian Photographic Prize at the Art Gallery of NSW. In 2006 he was a finalist in the same prize, and winner of the Head On Photographic Prize at the Australian Centre for Photography. He has been a finalist in the National Photographic Portrait Prize (Canberra), Blake Prize, and Olive Cotton Award. In 2012 he won the People's Choice Award in the Blake Prize, and has been a guest judge for the National Photographic Portrait Prize.

His works are held in public and private collections including the Art Gallery of NSW, Bathurst Regional Gallery, City Gallery Wellington (New Zealand), Gold Coast City Gallery, Lismore Regional Gallery, Maitland Regional Gallery, Monash Gallery of Art VIC, National Gallery of Australia, National Library of Australia, National Portrait Gallery, Queensland Art Gallery, State Library of NSW, Tweed Heads Regional Gallery and University of Technology.He has been featured in over twenty books and in over thirty exhibitions.
