= Rampage (2006 film) =

- Directed by: George Gittoes
- Starring: Angel; Ariel; Bam Bam
- Edited by: Nick Meyers
- Release date: 2006
- Running time: 118 minutes
- Country: Australia
- Language: English
- Box office: A$17,855 (Australia)

Rampage is a 2006 documentary by Australian war artist, George Gittoes. It is a sequel to his previous documentary, Soundtrack to War.

== Synopsis ==
The film follows the lives of three brothers living in Miami's notorious brown sub ghettos.

== Cast ==
Hip hop performers Swizz Beatz, Fat Joe, and DJ Kaleb appear in the film.

== Background ==
Elliot Lovett, whom Gittoes befriended during the filming of Soundtrack to War, told him of his family and his younger brother Marcus, who, he insisted, was a gifted poet-rapper. Gittoes made the trip to Miami to meet the family, with the intention of creating a stateside sequel to Soundtrack to War, continuing the theme of music in a dangerous place.
