= Lumino kinetic art =

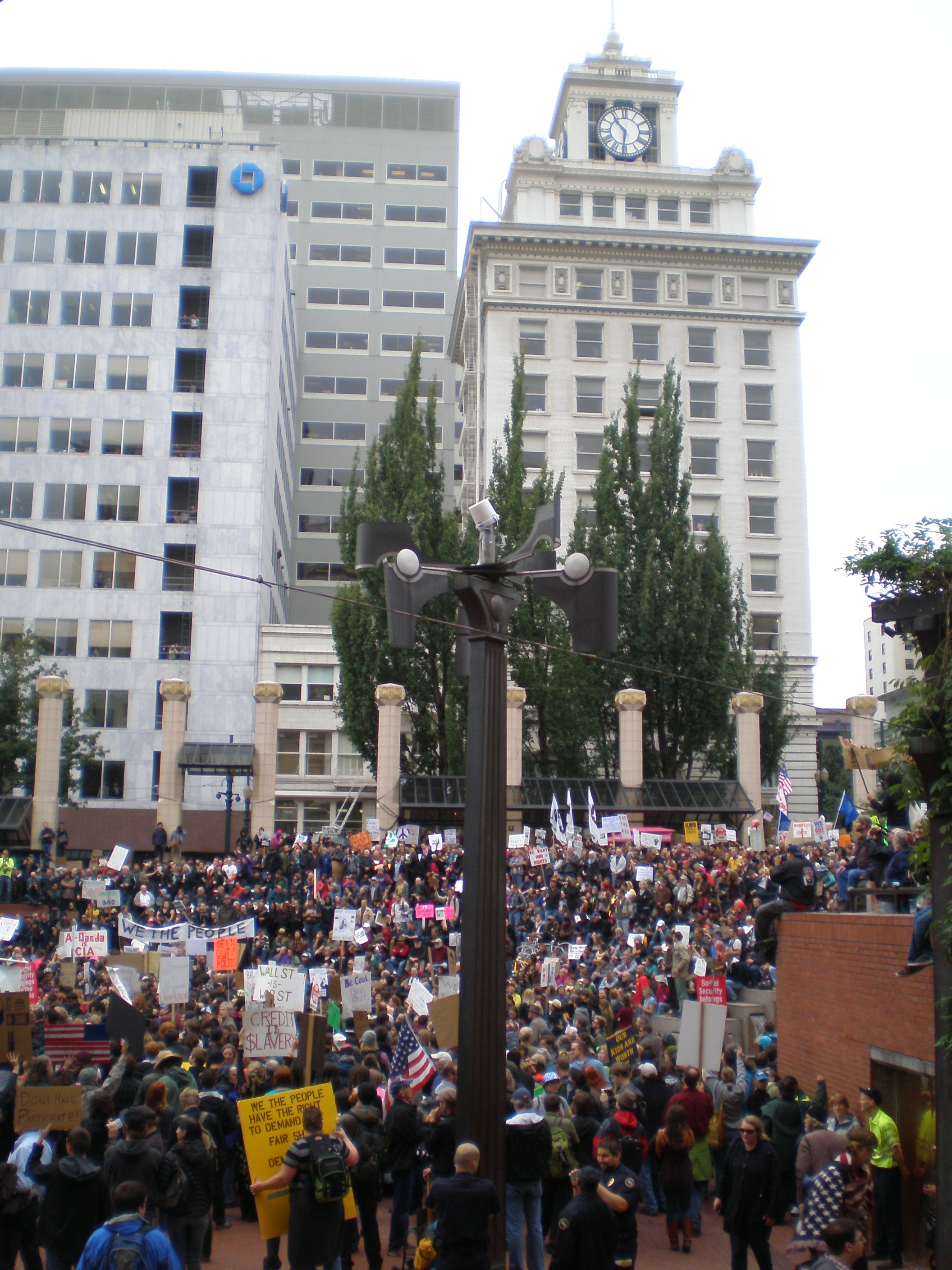
Weather Machine, a lumino kinetic bronze sculpture and columnar machine that serves as a weather beacon, displaying a weather prediction each day at noon, in Portland, Oregon.

Lumino Kinetic art is a subset and an art historical term in the context of the more established kinetic art, which in turn is a subset of new media art. The historian of art Frank Popper views the evolution of this type of art as evidence of "aesthetic preoccupations linked with technological advancement" and a starting-point in the context of high-technology art. László Moholy-Nagy (1895–1946), a member of the Bauhaus, and influenced by constructivism can be regarded as one of the fathers of Lumino kinetic art. Light sculpture and moving sculpture are the components of his Light-Space Modulator (1922–30), One of the first Light art pieces which also combines kinetic art.

The multiple origins of the term itself involve, as the name suggests, light and movement. There was an early cybernetic artist, Nicolas Schöffer, who developed walls of light, prisms, and video circuits under the term in the 50s. Artist/engineer Frank Malina came up with the Lumidyne system of lighting (CITE), and his work Tableaux mobiles (moving paintings) is an example of Lumino Kinetic art of that period. Later, artist Nino Calos worked with the term Lumino-kinetic paintings. Artist György Kepes was also experimenting with lumino-kinetic works. Ellis D Fogg is also associated with the term as a "lumino kinetic sculptor". In the 1960s various exhibits involved Lumino Kinetic art, inter alia Kunst-Licht-Kunst at the Stedelijk Van Abbemuseum in Eindhoven in 1966, and Lumière et mouvement at the Musée d'Art Moderne de la Ville de Paris in 1967.

Lumino Kinetic art was also aligned with Op art in the late 1960s because the moving lights were spectacular and psychedelic.

Frank Popper views it as an art historical term in the context of kinetic art; he states that "there is no lumino kinetic art after the early 70s; it stands as a precursor to other contemporary cybernetic, robotic, new media-based arts, and is limited to a very small number of (male) European avant-garde artists (part of the New Tendencies movement)".

== See also ==
- Kinechromatic art
- Lumia art
