= Festa Italiana Portland =

Annual event in Portland, Oregon, U.S.

- The festival set-up at Pioneer Courthouse Square in 2016
- Frequency: Annually
- Location: Portland, Oregon
- Country: United States
- Website: festa-italiana.org

Festa Italiana Portland is an annual event in Portland, Oregon, United States. It celebrates Italian American culture and features Italian-American cuisine, entertainment, and beer and wine gardens. The festival has been held in various venues, including Pioneer Courthouse Square during 2016-2018, Cedarville Park in 2023, Oaks Amusement Park in 2024, and St. Philip Neri Catholic Church in southeast Portland in 2025.

== See also ==
- Culture of Portland, Oregon
- List of festivals in the United States
