= Australian Photographic Portrait Prize =

Australian art award

The Citigroup Private Bank Australian Photographic Portrait Prize was a photographic art prize held at the Art Gallery of New South Wales in conjunction with the Archibald Prize, Wynne Prize and Sulman Prize. The winner received $15,000 to $20,000 and their work was automatically acquired for the Art Gallery's permanent collection. In its inaugural year in 2003 there were 560 entries received and 50 works exhibited. In 2005 entries rose to 657 and there were 49 works exhibited. The prize was discontinued in 2007.

== List of winners ==
- 2006 - Vanila Netto The magnanimous beige wrap part 1 - (contraption)
- 2005 - Cassandra Mathie Ali and Rahma
- 2004 - Roderick McNicol Robert Hunter 1984 & 2004
- 2003 - Greg Weight Railway Blues: Jim Conway
