= PDX Live =

Concert series in Portland, Oregon, U.S.

Logo

Sign for the series, 2025

PDX Live is an annual outdoor concert series at Pioneer Courthouse Square in Portland, Oregon, United States. True West organizes the event. Concerts can accommodate approximately 3,000 people.

Beabadoobee, Explosions in the Sky, Fleet Foxes, Japanese Breakfast, and Patti Smith were among performers in 2023. The 2024 line-up included Sleater-Kinney, Ethel Cain, and Toody Cole. Royel Otis and The Roots were part of the 2025 line-up. Musicians slated to perform in 2026 include Ani DiFranco, Modest Mouse, Vince Staples, and The Hold Steady.

== See also ==
- Culture of Portland, Oregon
