= Soundtrack to War =

- Release date: 2005
- Country: Australia

Soundtrack to War is a 90-minute documentary by Australian war artist George Gittoes. Filmed throughout 2003–2004, Gittoes bypassed the U.S. military's media lockdown on the war in Iraq to capture an authentic account of the human experience of the war. Gittoes interviewed American soldiers deployed in Iraq to create an account of the role of music in the contemporary battlefield. The film was followed by a sequel, Rampage.

Songs featured in the movie include Slayer's "Angel of Death" and Drowning Pool's "Bodies", as well as freestyle rap and gospel choirs. Seventeen of the early-filmed scenes from the documentary were used in Michael Moore's Fahrenheit 9/11.

The film is mentioned in the 2009 book Sound Targets: American Soldiers and Music in the Iraq War by Jonathan Pieslak.
