= Pioneer Courthouse Square =

Public space in Portland, Oregon, U.S.

Coordinates: 45.51887°N 122.6793°W

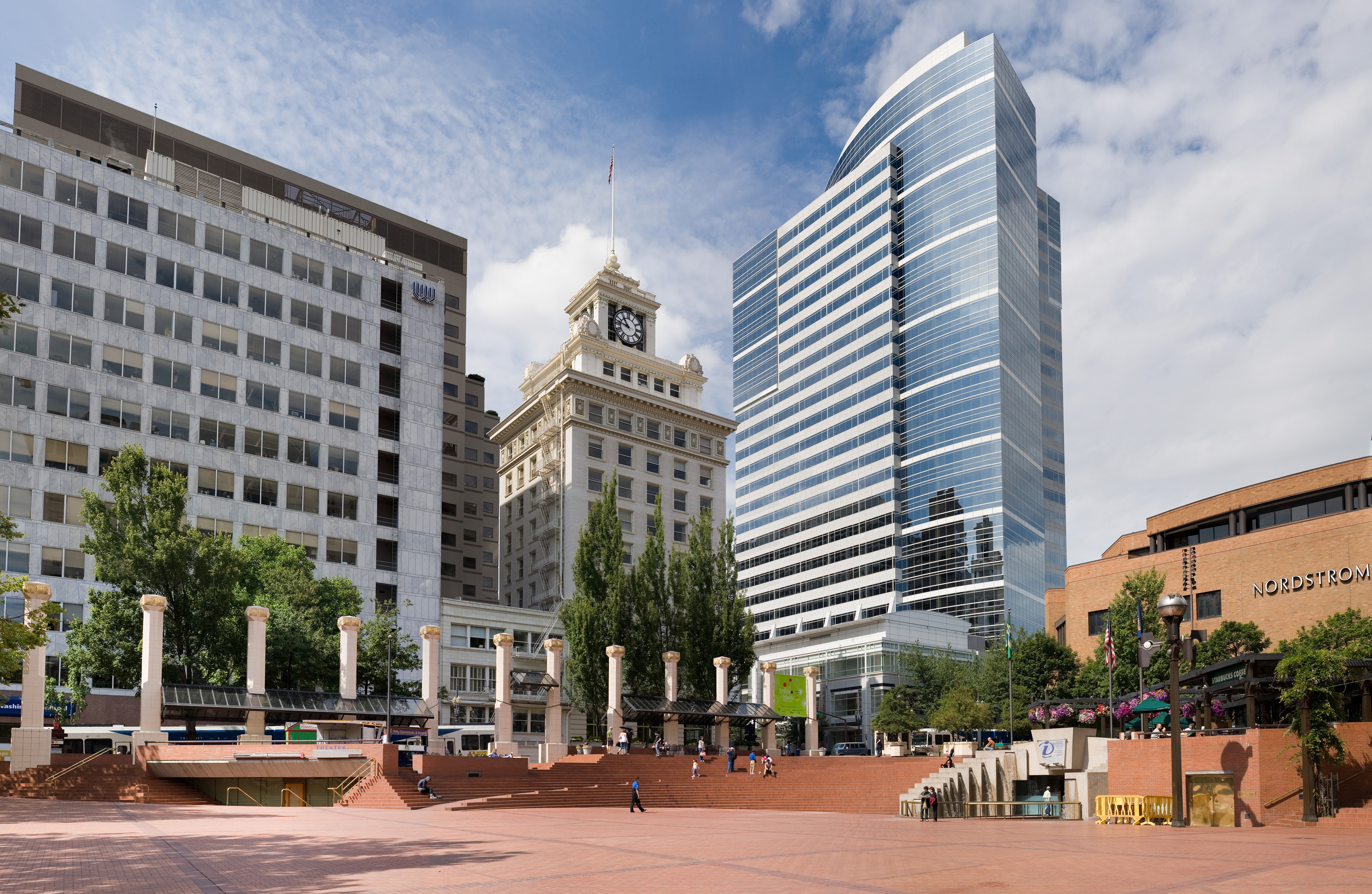
Pioneer Courthouse Square, with Fox Tower in the background

Pioneer Courthouse Square, also known as Portland's living room, is a public space occupying a full 40,000-square-foot (3,700 m^{2}) city block in the center of downtown Portland, Oregon, United States. Opened in 1984, the square is bounded by Southwest Morrison Street on the north, Southwest 6th Avenue on the east, Southwest Yamhill Street on the south, and Southwest Broadway on the west.

== History ==
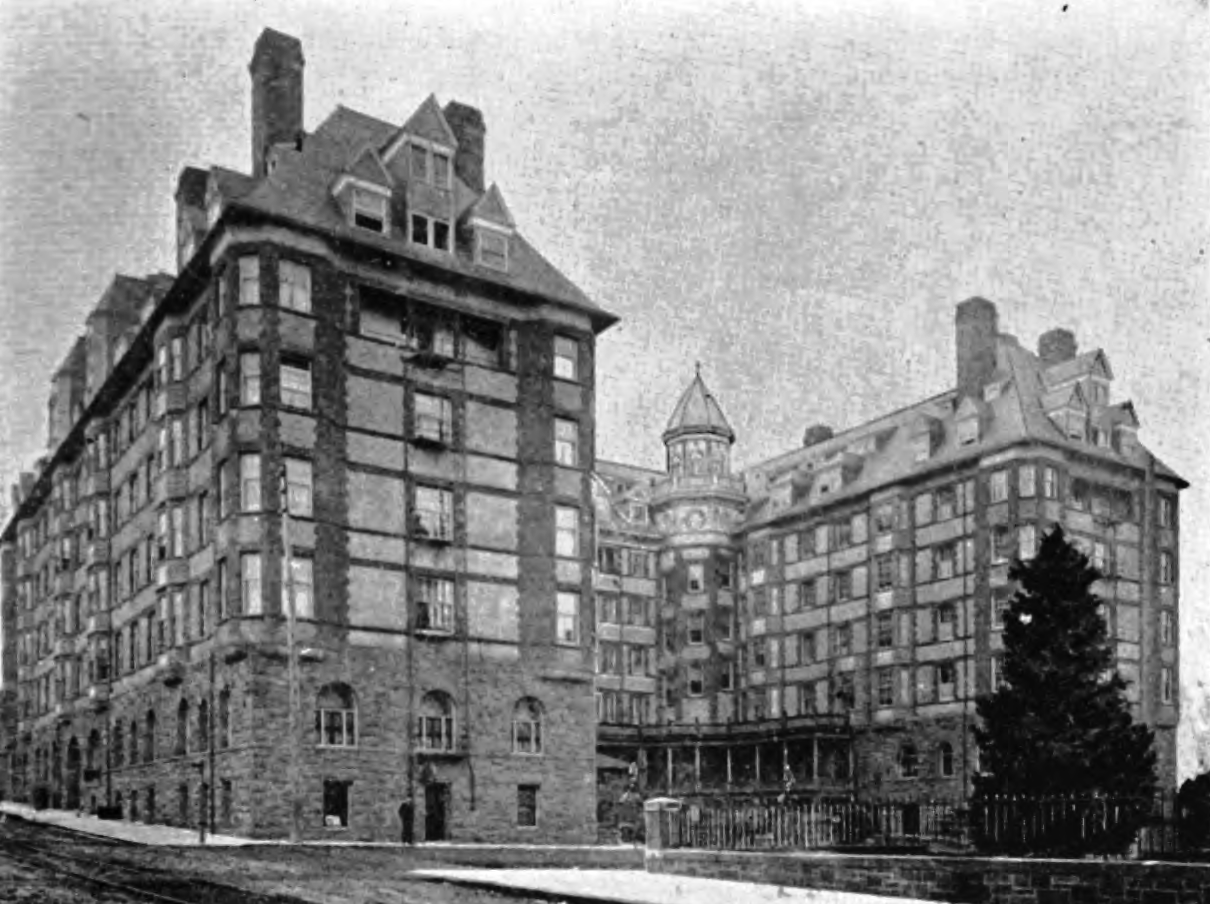
The Portland Hotel about 1900 at the site of the now-public square

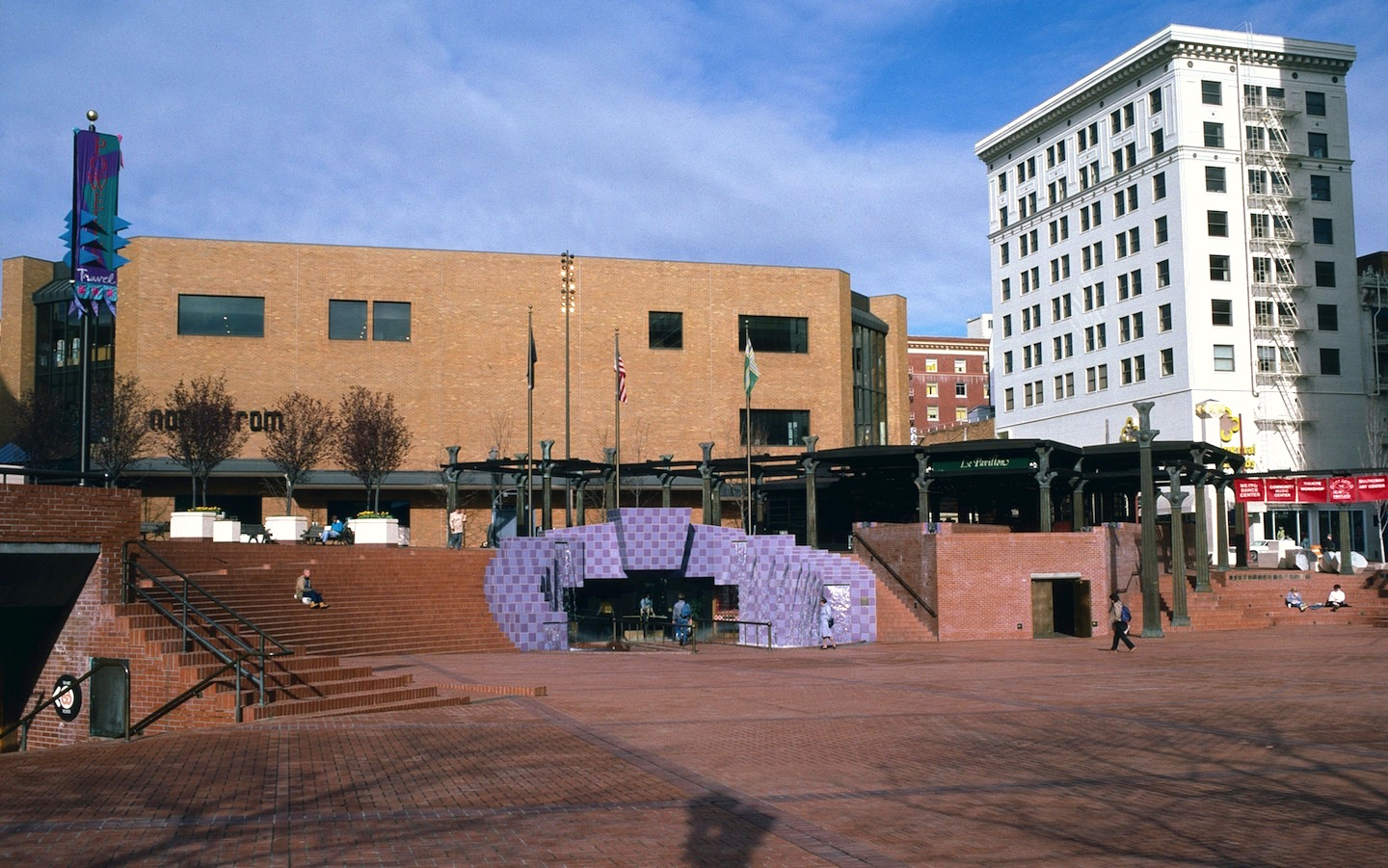
A 1986 view, showing the fountain's original color and a banner for Powell's Travel Store

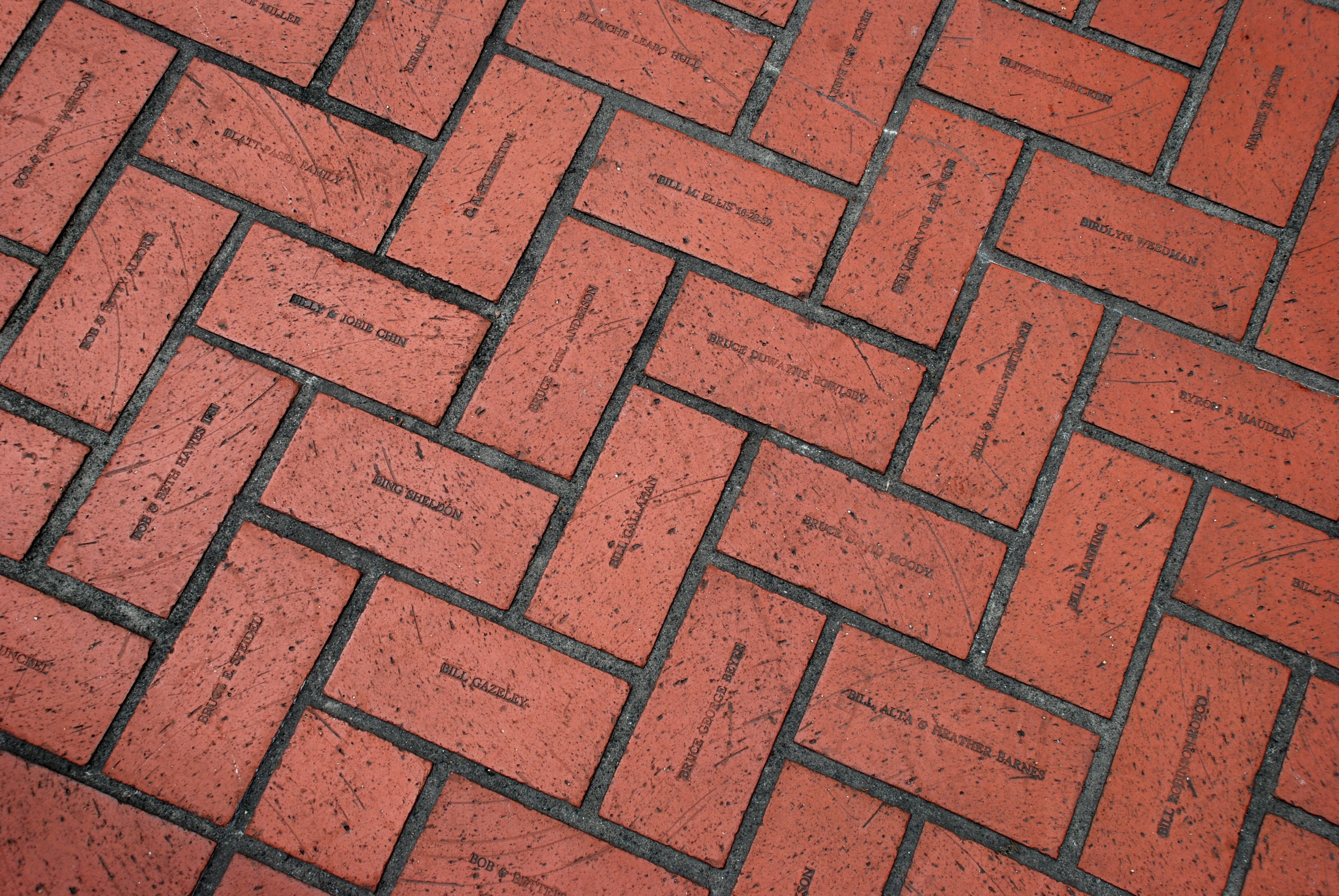
The square's surface is made up of bricks inscribed with the names of residents whose $15 donations in 1981–1982 helped fund its construction.

=== School and hotel ===
The city of Portland bought land that included the site in 1856, as the location for its Central School. The district financed its construction at Sixth and Morrison streets by suspending school operations for a year.

In 1879, investor Henry Villard came to Portland, looking for business support for a railroad hotel associated with his newly acquired Northern Pacific Railway. Philip A. Marquam contributed to the project by buying the school, clearing the site, moving the school to SW 6th and Alder, re-fitting it, and giving it back to the school district. (The relocated school stood until 1910.)

Villard hired the firm of McKim, Mead & White and its employee William M. Whidden to design the Portland Hotel, rising six stories to an attic with elaborate dormers, in an H-shaped plan with its main gated courtyard facing the Pioneer Courthouse, the landmark 1875 federal building directly to the east. Construction began in 1882, but Villard's financial reverses forced him to withdraw, and work was suspended for five years. Local leaders re-organized the project in 1888 and contacted Widden, who came west and partnered with Ion Lewis to complete the job in 1890. After delays due to a recession, the overall-eight-story hotel opened on the site in 1890. The hotel was the center of the city's social activity for the first half of the 20th century.

In 1951, the hotel was torn down and a two-story parking lot was built.

=== Civic square ===
An 800-car parking garage was proposed to the Portland Planning Commission in January 1969, but the commission rejected the idea, instead calling for a public plaza. In the early 1970s, a comprehensive downtown plan proposed that the site become dedicated public space. In 1975, Mayor Neil Goldschmidt began negotiating with local department store Meier & Frank to obtain the property for the city, and eventually convinced the store to sell the land to the city after its parking concerns were alleviated.

By early 1980, a design competition was announced, seeking proposals for what was to become Pioneer Courthouse Square. Out of 162 submissions, five finalists were chosen, from firms based in New York City, Philadelphia, San Francisco/Los Angeles, Boston, and Portland. The Portland team, an interdisciplinary "group of rabble-raising architects, writers, and an artist" consisting of chief designer and architect Willard Martin, landscape architect Douglas Macy, sculptor Lee Kelly, sculptor, historian Terrence O’Donnell, graphic artist Robert Reynolds, and writer Spencer Gill, were chosen as the winners by the City Council in May 1980. Their design received an "Architectural Design Citation" from Progressive Architecture magazine in 1981.

Remnants of the hotel, an original archway and iron gatework, are found today on the east side of the square.

Funding problems surfaced after the design was completed. Portland Mayor Frank Ivancie led a group of downtown business owners advocating a closed structure to prevent transients from congregating. Former governor Tom McCall, then a television commentator, was indignant: "It would be a shock ... to learn that a few power brokers have decreed that the result of the nationwide design rivalry is meaningless..."

The square's construction required $3 million for land acquisition and $4.3 million for the structures and amenities, a large enough amount that Ivancie's opposition nearly doomed the project. Martin, together with other architects and volunteers, drew attention to the delays from the opposition by painting a stylized blueprint of the proposal on the site itself. But it took the formation of "Friends of Pioneer Square", a citizens' group led by city commissioners Charles Ray Jordan and Mike Lindberg, and $750,000 raised by the sale of 50,000 inscribed bricks, to rescue the project.

The square opened on April 6, 1984, with an inaugural celebration that attracted more than 10,000 people. The square is owned by the city of Portland and is a city park.

=== Recent history ===
By October 1988, when the square's fountain was turned over to the Portland Water Bureau, it already needed repairs. The Oregonian called it "a leaker with corroding drain lines". Repair work was undertaken in 1995, during which the purple tiles that had originally surfaced the fountain were replaced with granite veneer. The fountain received another overhaul in 2006, but without any change to its appearance.

In 1989, a Starbucks coffeehouse opened at the northwest corner of the square, replacing a series of failed restaurants at the same location. Still in existence, this was the company's first Oregon outlet and its 40th overall.

In 2001, the completion of Fox Tower, a skyscraper on the block immediately southwest of the square, caused controversy among citizens because it blocks sunlight from reaching the majority of the square during the afternoon and evening hours.

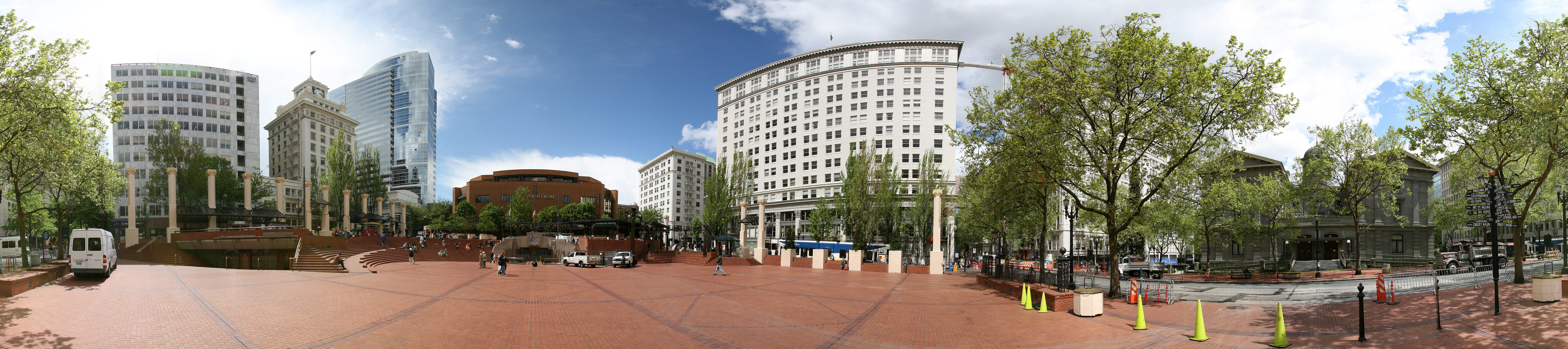
A panorama of Pioneer Courthouse Square from 2007

In 2002, the organization controlling the square had plans to add a large ice skating rink for four months of the year, at a cost of $12 million. The Pioneer Square group and Project for Public Spaces thought the rink would make the square more active in the winter months, and had funding pledged by The Oregonian and Wells Fargo Bank. There was a strong negative reaction, as admission would be charged, violating the free-speech ethos of the square and its design. As Park Block 5 was being designed, many felt the ice rink should be placed there instead.

On November 26, 2010, the square was the site of an attempted car bombing. Mohamed Osman Mohamud, a Somali-American student, was arrested after attempting to set off what he thought was a car bomb at a Christmas tree lighting ceremony. It turned out the bomb was inert and was part of an FBI sting operation. He was charged with attempting to use a weapon of mass destruction. In October 2014, Mohamud was sentenced to 30 years in federal prison along with credit for time served since his arrest, as well as lifetime supervision upon his scheduled release in 2037.

== Features and use ==
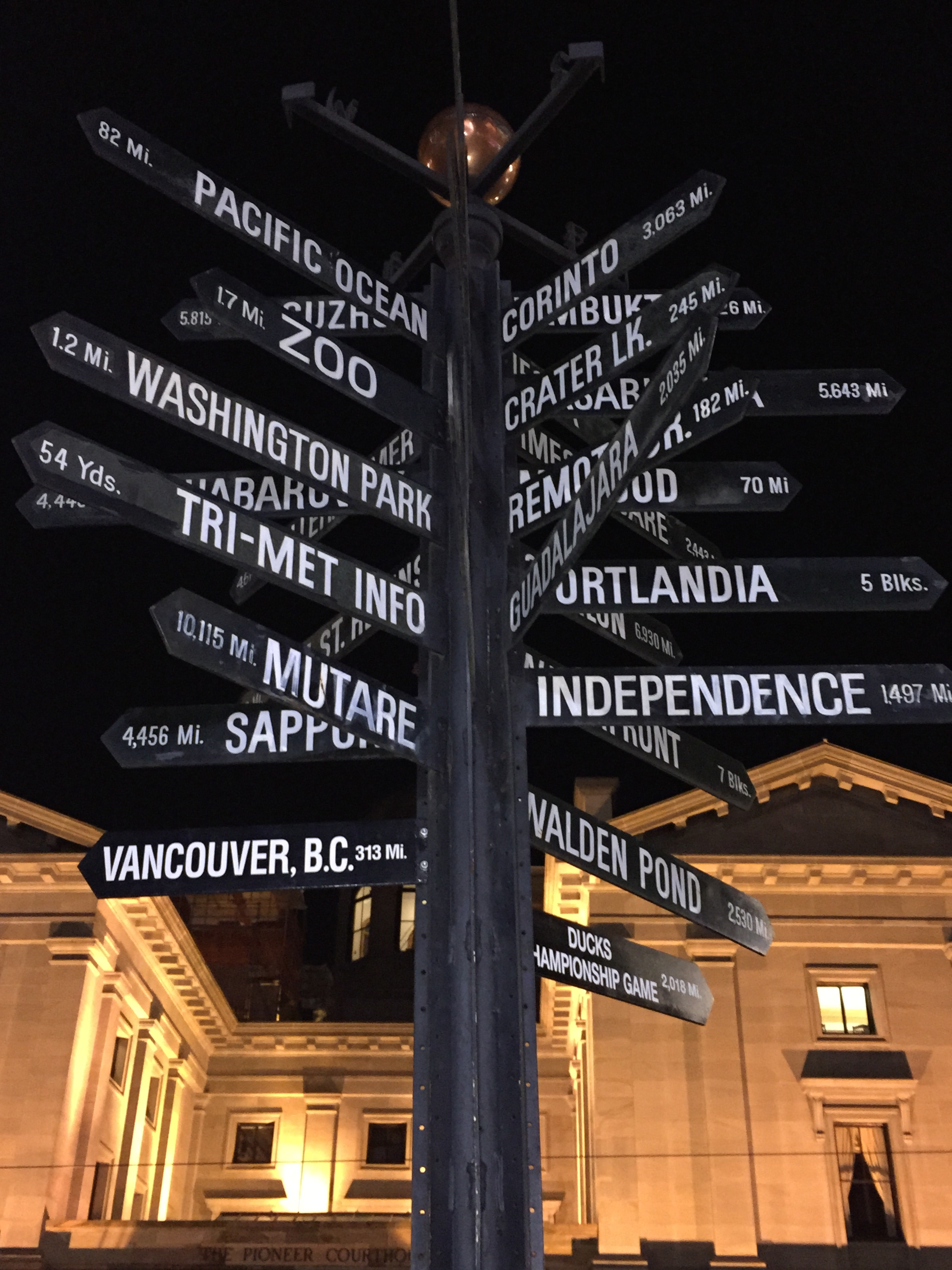
The milepost sign at the square at night

On Morrison and Yamhill streets (the north and south boundaries of the square) are sheltered MAX Light Rail stops. On the north side is an artistic feature, consisting of towering classical columns which progressively topple over like those of an ancient ruin. There are outdoor chess tables on some of the toppled columns; chess players frequently congregate there during the day. A fountain, taking the form of a cascading waterfall, on the west side of the square frames the entrance to a public information center and TriMet ticket office. The center of the square is arranged like an amphitheater, with a semicircle of approximately two dozen steps serving as seats when the square is used for musical performances or other events. Pioneer Courthouse Square was a designated non-smoking area as of January 1, 2007.

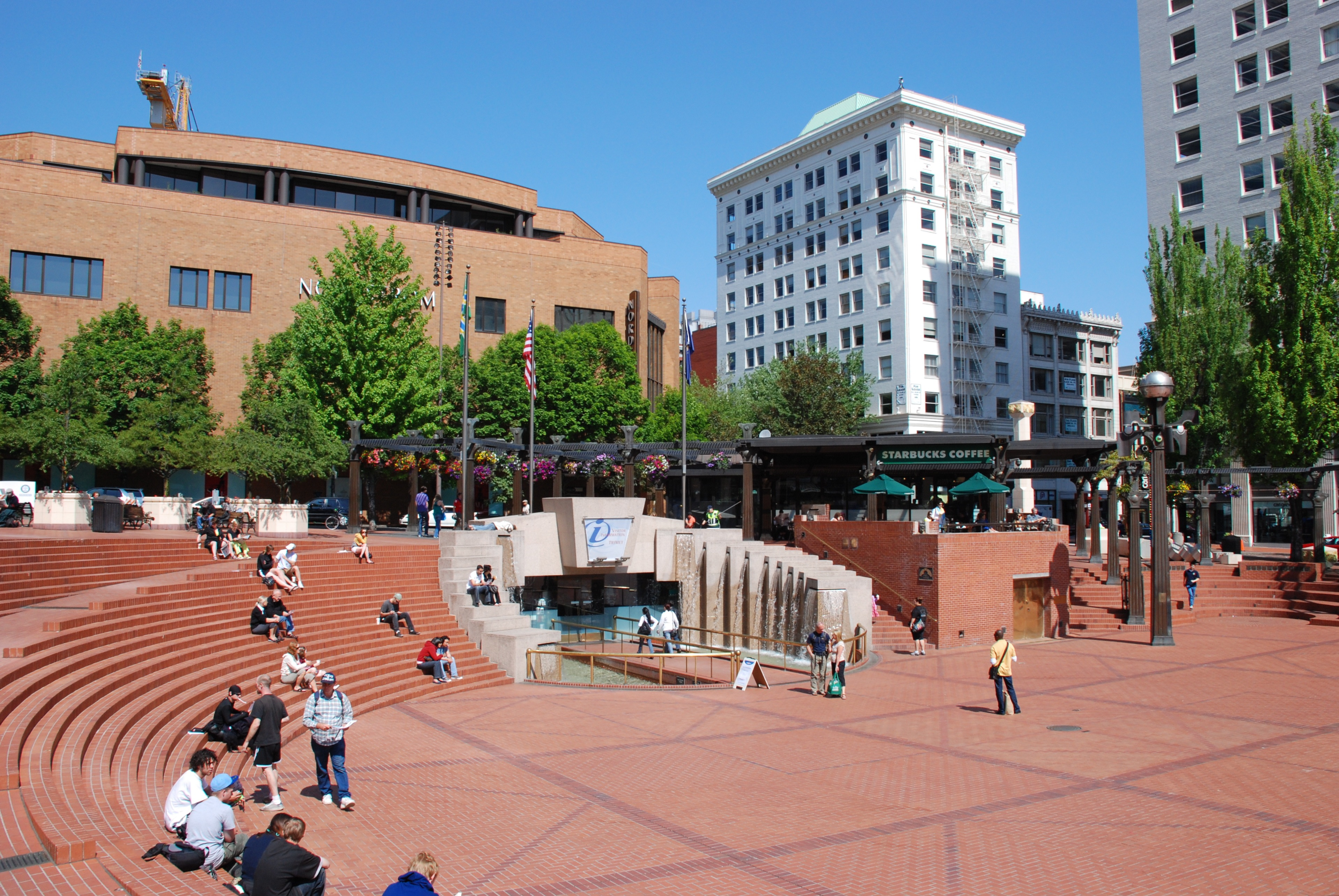
South and west sides of the square, looking northwest

The bricks used to pave the square were sold to raise funds for the square's construction, and are inscribed with donors' names. However, the bricks were not laid in any discernible order, so people looking for a particular brick must spend time walking around the park, head down. This leads to collisions with others looking for their bricks, and gave the park its nickname, "Bang Heads Park". Eric Ladd, an "early pioneer of…sustainable living," built the wrought-iron gateway on the eastern edge of the square in the 1970s, out of scrap salvaged from the Portland Hotel.

For almost 20 years, commercial space at the square's south end was occupied by a branch of Powell's Books. Opened in September 1985, it was called Powell's Travel Store and was focused exclusively on travel-related literature and supplies. The store closed at the end of January 2005, and the space was then vacant for an extended period, until KGW-TV, Portland's NBC affiliate, began leasing it in early 2008, with plans to construct a studio there.

In March 2009, KGW opened a high-definition news studio at the square, which it uses to broadcast its morning, noon and 7 p.m. newscasts. Regular broadcasts from the location began on March 17, 2009, with the 4:30 a.m. newscast. The space occupied by KGW is approximately 2,000 square feet (190 m^{2}) in area and underground, with a small window area near the square's 6th and Yamhill corner.

The square costs the city an estimated $1.2 million per year, mostly for security, cleanup, and events.

== Art ==
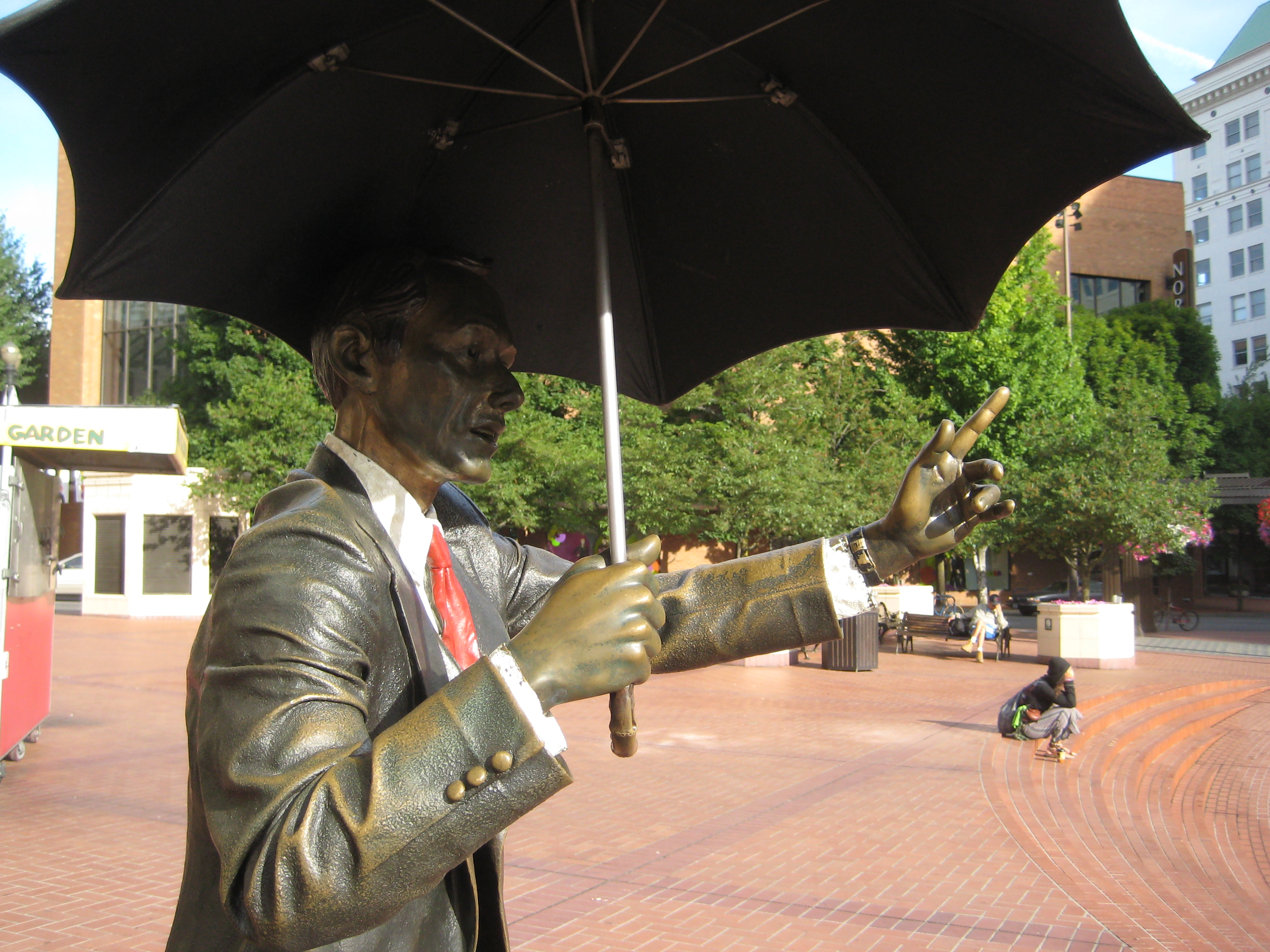
The sculpture Allow Me in 2008

One of the more recognized pieces of public art in Portland is Seward Johnson's Allow Me, commonly referred to as Umbrella Man. It is on the south side of the square, just above the amphitheater. Allow Me is a bronze statue of a man in a business suit holding an umbrella.

Weather Machine, a 33-foot-tall (10 m) metal column topped with a large silver-colored orb, was installed in August 1988. At noon each day, the following day's weather is announced with a fanfare of trumpets, flashing lights, and a spray of mist. The orb opens to reveal one of the following:

- a golden leaf sun, for a clear day;
- a silver great blue heron, to forecast a drizzly, misty, or overcast day;
- an open-mouthed copper dragon, when storms are forecast.

Light bulbs on the side of the machine are reminiscent of a mercury thermometer and light up progressively as the temperature increases.

== Events ==
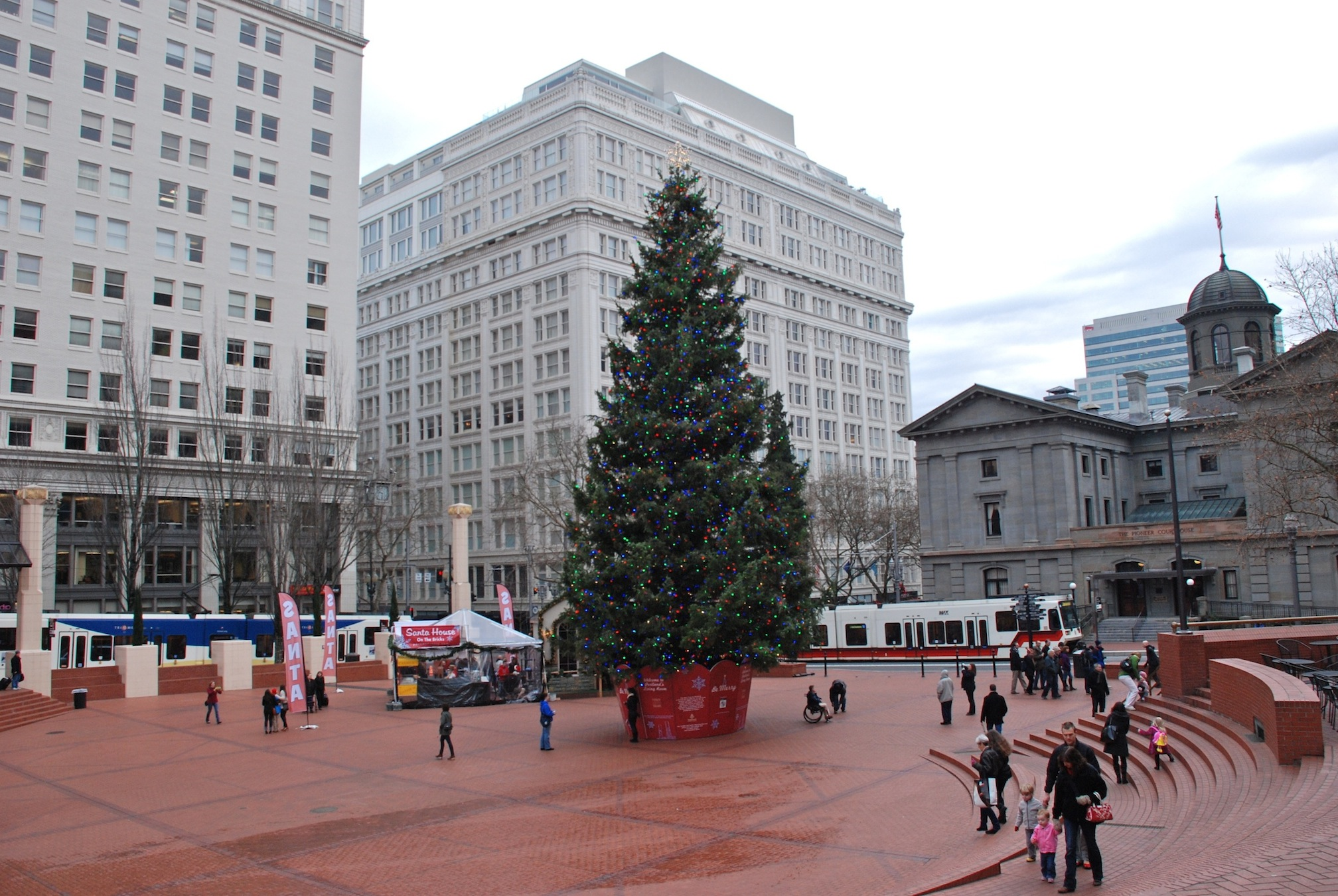
The Christmas tree is a popular annual feature for 5–6 weeks each year.

Dozens of events are held at the square each year, including free shows during spring and summer, sponsored by local businesses. Events held in the square are usually all-ages. In 2006, the square was the site of an all-city pillow fight, and later an all-city slumber party. Pioneer Courthouse Square is a venue for speeches, political demonstrations, rallies and vigils. By Thanksgiving, a tall Christmas tree occupies the center of the square, with a tree-lighting ceremony held each year on the Friday evening after Thanksgiving. Another Christmas event in the square is Tuba Christmas. This is a celebration featuring 200–300 tuba and euphonium players who perform a medley of holiday songs, and was first held in 1991. An annual New Year's Eve celebration is also held there.

On January 12, 1991, Pioneer Courthouse Square held one of the largest gatherings in its history, when a crowd estimated at more than 12,000 attended an anti-war rally protesting American involvement in the Gulf War, packing the square and overflowing onto the surrounding streets, which police temporarily closed to traffic.

== Reception ==
In 2006, architect Laurie Olin described Pioneer Courthouse Square, stating "you really can't sit in the shade in Pioneer Square. It's not quiet. The fountain looks like a Postmodern pit. It is intended to be a citywide park. It needs big, empty spaces. If it's empty, then [Director Park] should be full."

In 2004, the square was ranked as the world's fourth-best public park by Project for Public Spaces, bested only by two squares in Venice and one in Siena, Italy. Project for Public Spaces ranked it the third best public square in North America in 2005 after New York City's Rockefeller Plaza and New Orlean's Jackson Square. The American Planning Association designated Pioneer Courthouse Square as one of 10 Great Public Spaces in 2008.

== See also ==
- PDX Live, an annual outdoor concert series at Pioneer Courthouse Square
