= Shen Shaomin =

Artist

Shen Shaomin (沈少民, born 1956), is an artist based in Sydney and Beijing.

== Early years ==
Shen was born 1956 in Heilongjiang Province, China, and grew up in A Cheng Town. His father was a carpenter. As a child, he was fascinated by mechanics, and he liked to deconstruct and reconstruct objects.

Shen studied art history for three years at Harbin College of Education.

== Career ==
His artistic career began with print-making in 1979. He later switched to making soft sculptures out of defective fabric prints from a textile printing and dyeing factory.

He visited Australia in 1989 for an international print conference; he returned a month later for an exhibition, and then returned again in 1990. Shen returned to China while working on his skeletal creatures because of the many animal protection laws in Australia preventing him from acquiring bones.

== Exhibitions and collections ==
Shen has exhibited internationally in exhibitions, including the 2006 Liverpool Biennial, Mahjong at Museum of Fine Arts Bern in Switzerland, and Dialogue at East West Gallery in Melbourne.

His work has been exhibited at the Museum of Arts and Design in New York City, the Millennium Park in Chicago, the 4A Centre for Contemporary Asian Art in Sydney, the Museum on the Seam in Jerusalem, the New Art Gallery Walsall, the Metropolitan Museum of Manila, the Guangdong Museum in Guangzhou, the House of World Cultures in Berlin, the Seoul Museum of Art, and the Today Art Museum in Beijing, and many others.

His Bonsai series was exhibited at the 17th Sydney Biennale in 2010.

== Art works ==
=== Unknown Creatures ===
Each creature from Shen's original set of bone sculptures bears the title of "Unknown Creature No. __".

To create each creature, Shen collected the bones from a variety of animals, mixed them together to give them autonomy from the original creature, and then reconstructed a new skeleton that bore no resemblance to the original creature. By creating his sculptures in this manner, Shen's skeletons gained an appearance of authenticity, encouraging viewers to view them as if they were real skeletons of extinct creatures such as they might encounter in a museum.

=== Fighter X ===
Fighter X connects the past, present, and future. Shen got the idea for this work when he was perusing a second-hand market and found confidential plans for the military aircraft Fighter-6. It reminded him of his childhood fascination with mechanics and weaponry. He created it as a model of the ideal military aircraft. It highlights the deadly, brutal nature of weapons of war by exposing the machinery beneath the metal exterior. It also questions the dream many developing countries have of creating the latest military weapons.

The model is five meters long. It was shown at an exhibition from 9 September to 21 October 2007.

=== Bonsai series ===
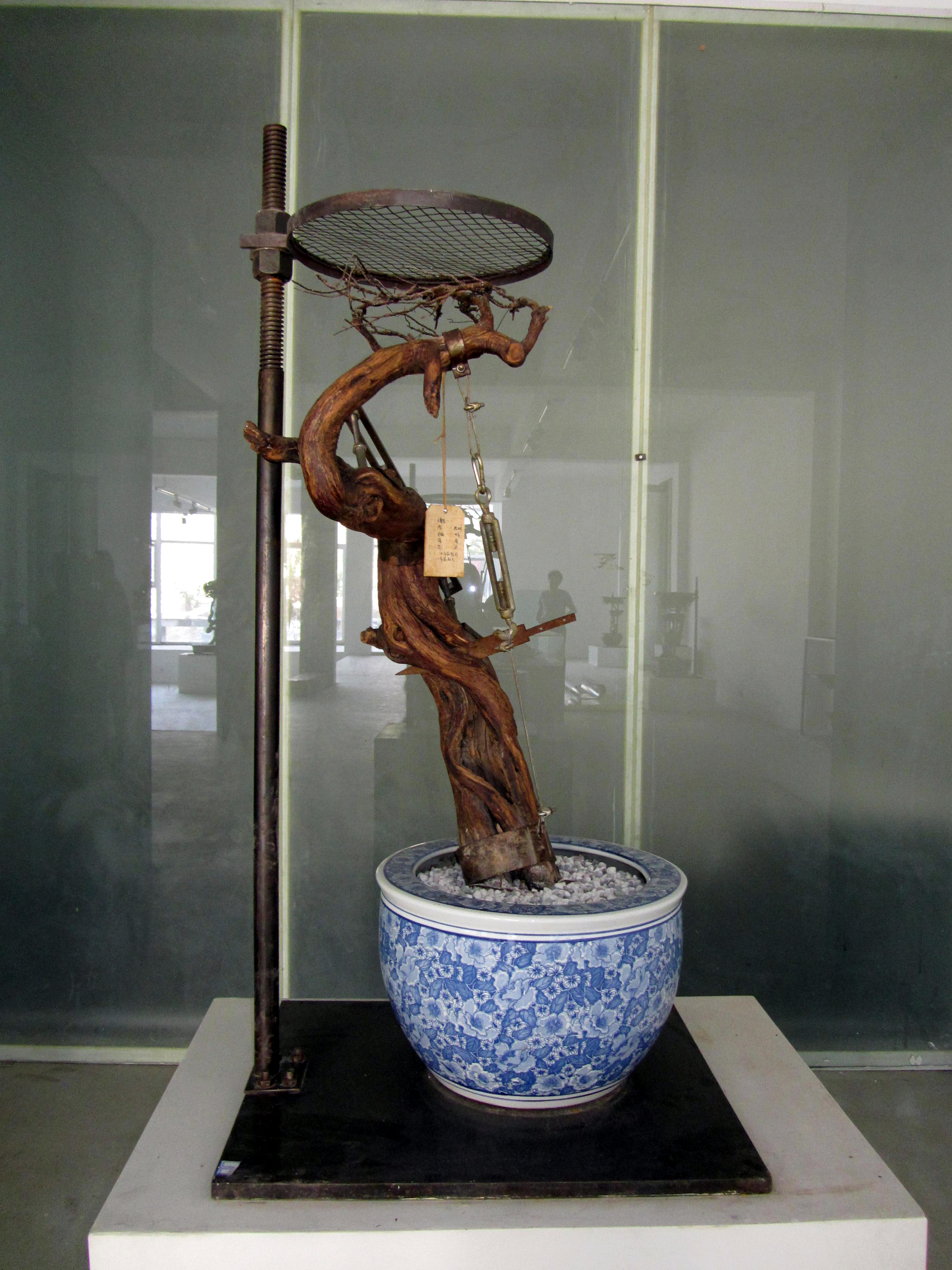
Shen Shaomin, Bonsai

Shen began his bonsai series in 2007. He created his bonsai by using wires, pulleys, cages, and other tools to make them appear tortured. He did this as a commentary on the brutality with which humans control their environment. It was also a commentary on how humans control each other, as a boss controls an employee and a parent or school controls a child. Michael Young wrote that the wires and pulleys on Shen's plants are "implements of torture and the props on which the organism depends to survive".

Shen was inspired to create these bonsai while looking for books about Chinese foot binding. During his research, he happened upon a manual detailing the process of bonsai-making and recognised its similarities to foot binding: They both drag and twist limbs to make them serve human interests. In an interview, Shen said, "I think the process of bonsai-making is basically the abuse of plants. You grow a sapling, then twist it to make it grow into artificial shapes. Despite the whole deforming process being extremely cruel, people find the bonsai beautiful". According to Shen, each tree took at least ten years to grow. He enlisted the help of many people from the Anhui province, as bonsai growing is a very common practice in that region.

=== Project No. 1: Tiananmen Reconstruction ===
Shen's Tiananmen Reconstruction Project, titled "Project No. 1", is a wooden model of the Tiananmen gate, re-designed so that it is twice as large as Tiananmen as it now stands. It is "accompanied by precise and detailed blueprints, construction progress photos, stills and an animated film of the interior." It was doubled in size to highlight the Chinese tendency to create oversize, extravagant buildings that stand in stark contrast to the poverty of the population. Many of the buildings surrounding Tiananmen are larger or more extravagant than Tiananmen itself, despite their lesser importance. Thus, Shen created this model to show how much larger and more extravagant Tiananmen would need to become to maintain its appearance in relation to these other buildings. Shen's version includes underground passageways, soldiers, and tanks. In addition, one room is set aside for soldiers to receive massages from young women wearing cute outfits.

=== I Sleep on Top of Myself ===
This series is composed of several hyper-real silicone animals stripped of their fur, including a cat, a chicken, pigs, sheep, and a lamb (among others). Each lies on a bed of its own fur, wool and feathers, arranged on top of a mound of salt. Each animal has a mechanical respiratory system, giving the sculptures an appearance of life. This series was shown at Shen's solo exhibition, The Day After Tomorrow in 2011 at 4A Centre for Contemporary Asian Art, Sydney. The exhibition's title refers to the work's focus on themes of evolution and uncertainty, and particularly emphasises the impact of humans in the world as a consequence of their search for freedom and progress.
