= George Gittoes =

Australian artist and filmmaker

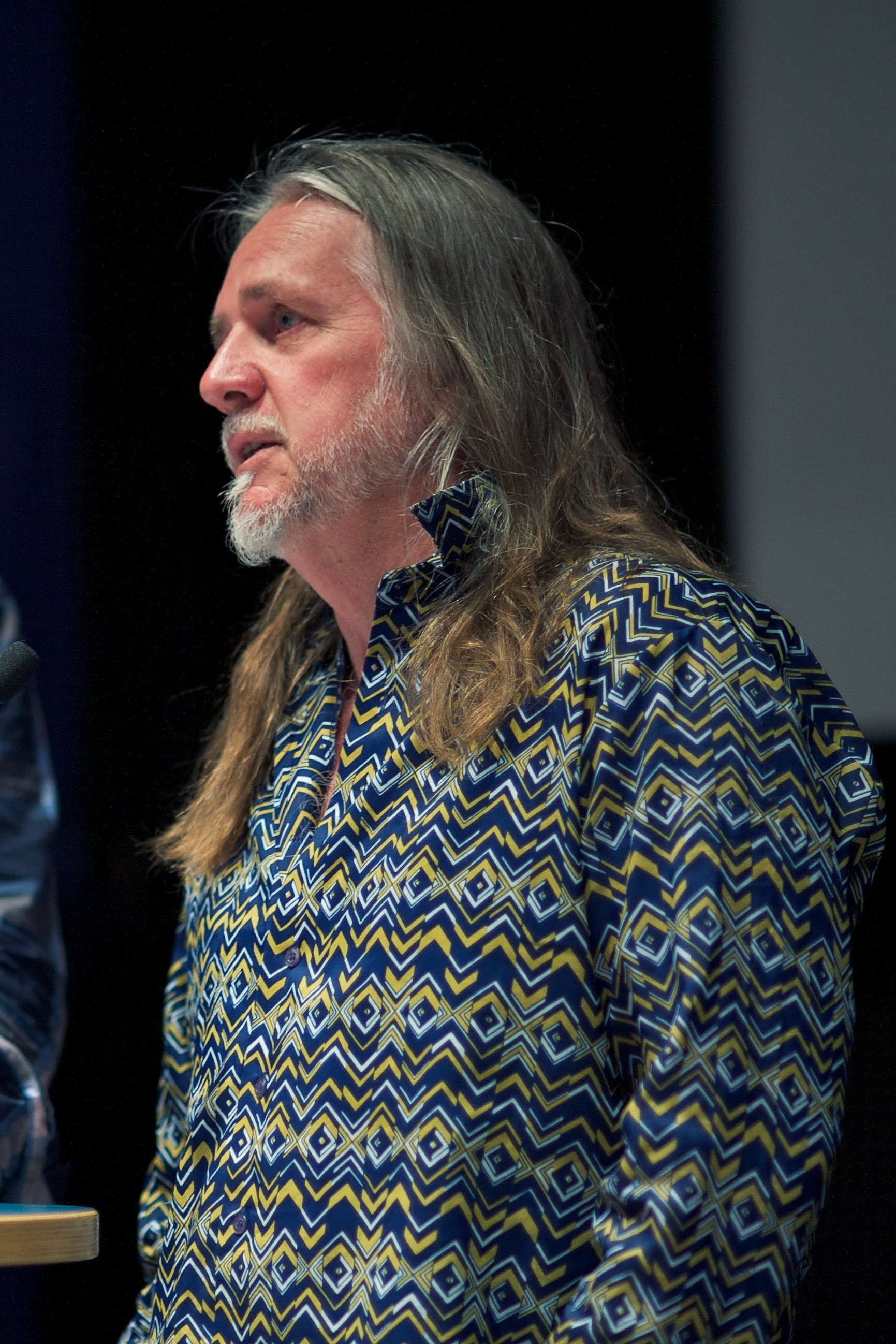
- George Gittoes
- Born: 7 December 1949 (age 76); Sydney, New South Wales, Australia
- Occupations: Artist, filmmaker, photographer, writer
- Years active: 1970–present
- Website: gittoes.com

George Noel Gittoes, AM (born 7 December 1949) is an Australian artist, documentary filmmaker, photographer, and writer. For the greater part of his career he has focused on human conflict, but always as a personal eye-witness. Since 1986 this has meant constant travel to war zones and areas of conflict, including Nicaragua, the Philippines, Somalia, Cambodia, Western Sahara and Algeria, the Middle East (including Israel, Palestine, and Lebanon), South Africa, Rwanda, Mozambique, Bosnia, Northern Ireland, China and Tibet, Bougainville, East Timor, Congo, and Iraq (both before and after the 2003 war), and troubled areas in the USA. Since 2007 he has worked particularly in Pakistan, Afghanistan and, since the Russian invasion in 2022, Ukraine. Having been a co-founder of the Yellow House Artist Collective in Sydney in 1970, in 2011 he opened a Yellow House Jalalabad in Afghanistan. Gittoes has worked in a number of media, including drawing, painting, photography, and film making. His work is held in major galleries around Australia, including the National Gallery in Canberra and the Australian War Memorial.

Gittoes has directed around 20 films, as well as collaborating on a number of Pashto-language dramas in Pakistan. His first wife, Gabrielle Dalton, collaborated as co-producer with Gittoes on many of his early films. His second wife, Hellen Rose, has been travelling with him and collaborating with him on many of his films made in conflict zones since around 2009. His most recent films have been filmed in Ukraine and in Afghanistan, since the Russian invasion of Ukraine in 2022.

== Early life and education ==
George Noel Gittoes was born in Sydney, New South Wales, on 7 December 1949, the son of public servant, Claude Gittoes (who eventually became Secretary of the NSW Department of Main Roads), and potter Joyce Gittoes (née Halpin). Other significant family influences were his maternal grandfather, racehorse trainer and local identity, George Halpin, whom Gittoes credits with instilling the toughness he later needed to remain calm in the face of danger, and his seven-years older sister, Pamela, also a painter.

Gittoes grew up in Rockdale, New South Wales, where at the age of 11 he would stage puppet shows in his backyard. When they became popular, he started charging for them, donating the proceeds to the Red Cross.

After an unhappy time at Kogarah High School,, he transferred to Kingsgrove North High School for his final two years. At school Gittoes became interested in Islamic cultures, and under his influence his art class specialised in Islamic art for the NSW Higher School Certificate in 1967.

In 1968 he commenced An Arts/Law degree at the University of Sydney, but abandoned it towards the end of the year to travel to New York after his lecturer, Bernard Smith, introduced him to the visiting American critic, Clement Greenberg. Greenberg encouraged Gittoes to visit America because he liked his minimalist abstract paintings, but once in New York Gittoes spent time at the Art Students League of New York, and worked with African American figurative painter Joseph Delaney. Influenced by Delaney’s concern with the civil rights movement, Gittoes’ art also became more political and he began the Hotel Kennedy Suite, inspired by opposition to the Vietnam War. He also met and briefly worked with Andy Warhol.

== Career ==
=== Overview ===
Gittoes is a painter, water-colourist, drawer, performance artist, filmmaker, photographer, printmaker, and sculptor. According to Mitchell Fine Art, he has been described as a pop artist, a figurative artist, a modernist, and a post-modernist, but his work is all related to documenting. Gittoes' early travels include: US, 1968-69; UK, Europe, and US, 1984; Nicaragua, 1986; Philippines 1989; Africa and Asia 1993-95. He earned the designation "unofficial war artist", having travelled under the auspices of the Australian Defence Force, usually with and their protection and some assistance from them, but with no constraints on his work.

Gittoes and his first wife Gabrielle Dalton, who often acted as producer, collaborated on many films made in Australia.

Gittoes and his second wife Hellen Rose, a musician and performance artist, have become well known for making anti-war art together since around 2011. It has seen them travel to several war zones in countries such as Pakistan, Afghanistan, Cambodia, Somalia, and Ukraine, where they travelled to make a documentary film about local artists. Gittoes produces, directs, and shoots the films, while Rose co-produces, acts, and creates the soundtracks.

=== Work in Australia, 1970–1985 ===
Returning to Australia in late 1969, a meeting with Martin Sharp led to the establishment of the Yellow House in the King’s Cross area of Sydney. Gittoes worked with another friend, Bruce Goold, to transform a two-storey building in Macleay Street, Potts Point, into a space in which artists, film-makers and performers could both live and exhibit their work. In an Australia whose culture had been seen by many as stifled and colonial, the Yellow House was a revelation. Gittoes’ own particular contribution was a psychedelic Puppet Theatre, in which he and assistants performed to enthusiastic audiences, using glove puppets Gittoes himself made. In 1971 Gittoes, unsympathetic with some of the directions the Yellow House was taking, broke away from the group. He had also been very deeply affected by the suicide of his girlfriend, Marie Briebauer. He had met Briebauer in San Francisco, and eventually she followed him to Sydney. But she was facing up to difficult issues with her family, and was not completely accepted by the Yellow House community. For Gittoes, Briebauer’s death was “a shattering experience”, memories of which would recur in his darker works.

A keen surfer, Gittoes travelled for a while in a caravan up and down the south coast of NSW. Eventually he settled in Bundeena, New South Wales, a village between sea and bush south of Sydney. For a time abandoning the politically driven art inspired by Joe Delaney, Gittoes produced a large series of photographs, drawings and paintings, eventually leading to a short film, Rainbow Way (1977). These images were abstract, using ideas drawn from both Islamic and Aboriginal art (in the latter case, especially the creation myth of the Rainbow Serpent), but also created out of direct observation of the effects of light underwater. He also experimented for a time with holograms and with computer-generated images, working with CSIRO scientist Zoltan Hegedus and Melbourne artist Paula Dawson, and Jack Alexander of the University of NSW. Art historian Gabrielle Dalton collaborated with him on the film, and they later married. Gittoes’ interest in Aboriginal art and performance, which began with meeting dancers from Mornington Island in 1972, led in 1977 to a trip to the Northern Territory and Western Australia. Martin Wesley-Smith composed music for the film.

Gittoes and Dalton were keen to bring art and performance to a wide audience. In 1979 they formed the environmental theatre group, Theatre Reaching Environments Everywhere (TREE), with Martin Wesley-Smith, Ronaldo Cameron, and Ian Fredericks. Between 1979 and 1984 TREE presented a number of huge theatrical events, mostly on beaches around Sydney, involving hundreds of local people. Gavin Fry has described these as “some of the most complete and spectacular art performances Australia has seen”. Gittoes and Dalton made a film called Wattamolla that was shown at the International Dance Film and Videotape Festival and Conference in New York in June 1981.

Around the same time, keen to return to social issues, Gittoes made Refined fire, a highly experimental but also “truly apocalyptic” film about misuse of fossil fuels and the danger of nuclear war. Now, in partnership with Dalton, Gittoes turned to documentary film-making, first with Tracks of the Rainbow (1984), a film about a group of Aboriginal children from New South Wales travelling north to meet with tribal elders from Mornington Island. This was followed in 1985 with a trilogy of films about life, cultural confrontation, and art in the Northern Territory: Warriors and lawmen (about conflict between Aboriginal people and the white legal system), Frontier women, and Unbroken spirit.

=== Broadening horizons, 1986–1993 ===
Since 1986, Gittoes career has particularly focused on areas of war and conflict. He and Dalton conceived of a series of films on women who were active in war zones, titles Where she Dares. In 1986 Gittoes went to Nicaragua, intending to make a film about NBC reporter Jamie Gangel. When that proved politically awkward, he turned his attention to four women Sandinista fighters who also wrote poetry. The result was The Bullets of the Poets (1986).

This was to have been followed in 1989 by a film about women political prisoners in the Philippines, but changes to tax rules in Australia meant that funding dried up. Nevertheless, Gittoes made a number of powerful paintings focusing especially on the numerous atrocities being committed in the Philippines.

The success of the Northern Territory and Nicaragua works led to an invitation from the Wollongong City Art Gallery to be an artist-in-residence, working initially at the BHP steelworks at Port Kembla. This led to a long series titled Heavy Industry, completed between 1989 and 1992, encompassing steelworks and mines in Port Kembla, Broken Hill, Newcastle (NSW), Whyalla (South Australia) and Ipswich (Queensland). As well as portraying the giant machinery of an industry in decline, many of the works were sensitive portraits of ordinary workers. One depiction of the Abedare Colliery in Ipswich, Queensland, Open Cut, won the Wynne Prize for landscape art in 1993.

Also in this period, Gittoes won the 1992 Blake Prize for Religious Art for Ancient Prayer, a portrait of his old friend Ronaldo Cameron in the advanced stages of motor neurone disease.

The Gulf War of 1991 produced in Gittoes a strong sense of outrage, leading to a series of etchings, Empire State Suite, and a major painting, Baghdad Starry Night. It also inspired a new belief that the artist could “be an independent witness – to challenge the image making of the mass media."

=== Peacekeeping artist, 1993–2001 ===
Lieutenant General John Grey, Chief of the General Staff of the Australian Army, had been impressed by the Heavy Industry series and, with the Army keen to publicise its expanding role in peacekeeping, the Army collaborated with the Australian War Memorial to send Gittoes to two areas where large numbers of Australian peacekeepers were serving, Somalia and Cambodia. Although not appointed an Official War Artist, he travelled with the support of both institutions to document the Australian role, while retaining his artistic freedom.

In March 1993 travelled to Somalia, where an Australian battalion was serving with the US-led Unified Task Force (UNITAF). Years of drought and civil war had led to collapse of internal order, and the peacekeepers were needed to make it possible to distribute humanitarian aid. While producing many iconic images of Australian soldiers, Gittoes also turned his attention to the plight of the local civilians. He also began to make drawings with a large block of text on one side, telling the story of the individuals depicted.

Soon afterwards, in May and June 1993, Gittoes visited Australia’s other major peacekeeping operation at the time, in Cambodia. After two decades of genocide and civil war, Australian diplomatic leadership had helped achieve a peace agreement, leading to free elections. Australia provided signallers to the resulting UN operation, the UN Transitional Authority in Cambodia (UNTAC), and UNTAC’s force commander, Lieutenant General John Sanderson. Gittoes documented the activities of the Australian signallers, and painted a portrait of Sanderson (now in the Australian War Memorial), but was also deeply moved by the stoic endurance of Cambodian victims of the war, including the many landmine victims.

In early 1994, again with the support of Lieutenant General Grey, Gittoes visited a series of peacekeeping missions where Australians were serving. Under Minister for Foreign Affairs Gareth Evans, this period was a highpoint of Australian peacekeeping. Gittoes went first to Western Sahara, where Australian signallers were part of the UN Mission for the Referendum in Western Sahara (MINURSO). Afterwards he travelled to the Middle East, visiting Australians with the US-led Multinational Force and Observers (MFO) in the Sinai, and military observers serving with the UN Truce Supervision Organization (UNTSO) in Israel, Syria and Lebanon. Visiting Hebron in the aftermath of the Hebron massacre of February 1994 further convinced him of the importance of the artist as witness and counterpoint to official accounts.

Later in 1994 Gittoes made a self-funded trip to South Africa to witness the first free elections, which brought Nelson Mandela to power. His sympathies with the black cause led to his being severely beaten up by members of the white supremacist Afrikaner Resistance Movement (AWB).

1994 also saw the genocide of around 800,000 people, mainly Tutsis, in the small landlocked country of Rwanda. After the grossly inadequate initial United Nations response, Australia contributed a medical contingent with infantry support to the enlarged United Nations Assistance Mission for Rwanda (UNAMIR II). Under the auspices of the Australian Army, Gittoes visited the mission in April 1995, and was sent to document the closure of the giant Kibeho camp for internally displaced persons. The closure turned into a massacre of the refugees, in which at least 4,000 and probably many more died. As well as helping the Australian medical staff rescue and treat the wounded, Gittoes meticulously documented the tragedy with photos, drawings and, later, paintings. One painting, The Preacher, of a man with a Bible amidst a crowded sea of refugees, won the 1995 Blake Prize for Religious Art. After Rwanda he travelled to Mozambique to visit Australian de-miners with the UN Operation in Mozambique (ONUMOZ).

Gittoes continued to visit peacekeeping operations and scenes of conflict, though no longer always under the auspices of the Army. In 1996 he made a privately funded trip to Sarajevo in Bosnia, to document the effects of the siege of Sarajevo during the Bosnian War. The following year he presented a major installation on Kibeho in Kassel, Germany, and later travelled to Northern Ireland in towards the end of the Troubles.

In1998 Gittoes had a residency at the Central Academy of Fine Arts in Beijing, and also travelled to other parts of China and to Tibet. He also travelled to Bougainville, which had fought a long civil war in an effort to break away from Papua New Guinea, working with Australian members of the multinational, Australian-led Peace Monitoring Group. The China residency and Gittoes' thoughts about documenting the dark side of humanity in a tumultuous period were covered in a 1999 documentary, I Witness: the art of George Gittoes, directed by Don Featherstone and shown on the ABC.

Gittoes had encountered land mine victims in Nicaragua in 1986 and Cambodia in 1993. Now, in association with the Australian Network of the International Campaign to Ban Landmines and support from the Australian government, Gittoes travelled to Thailand, Cambodia, Afghanistan, Pakistan, East Timor, Congo and Rwanda, leading to a 2000 exhibition, “Minefields”, at the Palais des Nations in Geneva. In 2001 he travelled again to South Africa, Israel and Palestine.

=== After 9/11, 2001–2006 ===
Gittoes was back home in Bundeena preparing works for an exhibition titled Persistence of Hope when the terrorist attacks in New York on 11 September 2001 reshaped the world. For the next quarter century, much of his work would focus on the resulting wars in the Middle East, a region where Gittoes himself had witnessed the aftermath of terrorist attacks. In 2002 he travelled for six weeks with Médecins sans Frontières to refugee camps in Afghanistan set up following the American invasion of the country in October 2001. In the same period, a commission to produce three works, collectively titled War on Terra, for an apartment block in Melbourne was cancelled, though the works were subsequently exhibited in Melbourne’s St Paul’s Cathedral.

In 2002, Gittoes visited New York to photograph a city still in mourning following 9/11. On the same trip, he took part in protests in Washington against George W. Bush’s impending invasion of Iraq, but realised that many of the protestors were Vietnam–era baby boomers, while the younger generation who would actually fight the war were more influenced by rap music and MTV. In 2003 and 2004 Gittoes visited Iraq four times, once just before the American invasion and three times during the American occupation. Interviewing Americans and Iraqis about the importance of music in contemporary war, he made the widely acclaimed film, Soundtrack to War (2004). He also recorded music of Baghdad residents, as well as music created by African American soldiers, who made up most of the force there. In 2005, Soundtrack to War screened at the Sydney and Berlin Film Festivals, the Museum of Modern Art in New York, Museum of Contemporary Art in Sydney, as well as in cinemas in Europe, the US, and Australia. Seventeen scenes in Soundtrack were used by Michael Moore used 17 scenes from Gittoes' film in his 2004 film Fahrenheit 9/11. An exhibition of works from these trips, No exit: A tale of two cities – George Gittoes in New York and Baghdad, was shown in both cities as well as Sydney.

His 2006 film Rampage is focused on the Miami subculture of a group of African American soldiers he had met in Iraq. It was screened at the Berlin, Sydney, Vancouver, and Montreal World Film Festivals ahead of cinema release Australia, the UK, and the US. Critic Margaret Pomeranz described Rampage as "intensely human, vulnerable, and insightful".

=== Pakistan and Afghanistan, 2007–present ===
In 2007 he went to the North-West Frontier Province of Pakistan to make the third of a trilogy of films created as a response to the "war on terror", using this term as the series title. The first version of the film, titled The Miscreants, was screened at the 2008 Sydney Underground Film Festival. The final version, titled The Miscreants of Taliwood, was screened at the Telluride Film Festival in 2009, followed by a cinema release.

In July 2009, Gittoes went to live in Berlin, Germany.

In 2011, he relocated to Jalalabad, Afghanistan, with his wife Hellen Rose, and established Yellow House Jalalabad (YHJ). Two films were made there: Love City Jalalabad (2013) and Snow Monkey (2015).

In 2018 he made White Light, about violence in Chicago, a feature documentary about the people involved in gun violence in Chicago, which was screened on ABC Television. No Bad Guys (2021), a sequel to White Light, is also about gun and gang violence in Chicago, particularly on May Block. It follows the lives of both the perpetrators and the bereaved families of the victims. Three of the subjects of the film were killed during the making of the film, which started filming in 2018, shot by Gettoes, Waqar Alam, and Hellen Rose, who was also responsible for the music and production. No Bad Guys was screened at the Melbourne International Documentary Festival, where it won Best Australian Director; Bridge of Peace Film Festival, where it won Best Documentary; and at the Sydney Underground Film Festival.

==== Ukraine ====
Gittoes and Rose went to Ukraine soon after the Russian invasion in 2022, and filmed there over three and a half years during the subsequent war in Ukraine. Basing themselves in Kyiv, they were assisted in their work by a local woman, Kate Parunova. Gittoes also created many artworks, and the couple collaborated with Ukrainian artist Ave Libertatemaveamor on new works, which were later shown in an exhibition titled George Gittoes: Ukraine Guernica at the Hazelhurst Arts Centre in Sydney. In 2022, Gittoes and Libertatemaveamor collaborated to produce a huge mural, Kiss of Death, on the outside wall of the Irpin House of Culture in Irpin, near Kyiv. The kiss refers to the portrayal of Putin "as a hideous insect-like creature clumsily kissing his contortionist lover, grossly 'feeding off each other'". The two artists also created a graphic novel of the same title in 2024.

In the film Ukraine Guernica: Art Not War, events in Ukraine are linked to Gittoes' and Rose's ongoing Yellow House Jalalabad, a creative centre and art school. The film shows many atrocities of the war, including the bombing of the House of Culture in Irpin, as Russia tries to deny that there is a distinct Ukrainian culture. Despite its gutting, artists continue to give performances and exhibitions, to show that their spirits cannot be destroyed. Gittoes and Rose have noted many similarities between Ukraine and Australia. The film opened the Sydney Underground Film Festival on 6 September 2023, and also screened at Melbourne International Film Festival; Screenwave International Film Festival in Coffs Harbour, NSW; and Salem Film Fest in Salem, Massachusetts. It also screened in competition in the Asia Pacific Screen Awards, won an award at Oniros Film Awards in New York, and was a finalist in the Bridge of Peace Awards in 2023.

Humanity in Danger opens with Picasso's famous anti-war painting, Guernica, and was screened widely in Ukraine in 2024/5. Its official release date is 27 August 2025.

=== Yellow House Jalalabad ===
Gittoes and Rose moved to Afghanistan in 2011 and established Yellow House Jalalabad (YHJ), where they made two films: Love City Jalalabad (2013) and Snow Monkey (2015). Rose described the town as "a place lost in time due to thirty years of war and very little to do with the outside world".

Rose had to wear a burqa when she went outside in Jalalabad. She created an underground studio in the building's bomb shelter, so that women's singing and dancing could not been seen or heard outside, dubbed "the Magic Room" She ran film and editing workshops for young women, the "Women's Team", and created a series of phantasmagorical works, which were photographed by Gittoes. She tried to give the women a sense of "inner freedom", playing theatre sports and teaching them meditation. American performance artist Carolee Schneemann met Gittoes and Rose, and admired their work at YHJ.

Gittoes and Rose were planning to return to Jalalabad in August 2021 to continue their work there, and to make a film on the withdrawal of troops from Afghanistan. However, after the Taliban took power in Afghanistan and the Yellow House Jalalabad creative community was threatened, it relocated to Peshawar, in the Tribal Belt of Pakistan. This "Yellow House in exile" was named the Yellow Submarine, and serves as a sanctuary for the artists until such time as it is safe to return to Jalalabad.

=== Miscellaneous art works ===
In 2014, Gittoes was invited by Julian Assange to the Ecuadorean Embassy in London where Assange was staying. He did three small portraits of Assange titled As Game As – Ecuador Embassy, saying that he saw Assange as a kind of "Wild Colonial Boy like Ned Kelly". He entered one of the portraits into the 2017 Archibald Prize, where he had previously been a finalist in 1991, 1993, 1994, 1995, and 1997. A second portrait of Assange was entered into the Doug Moran National Portrait Prize.

== Recognition and honours ==
In the 1990s, Gittoes was invited to speak in the US and Germany on many occasions, and had a residency at the University of Michigan.

In 1992 he won the Blake Prize, for his work Ancient Prayer, and again in 1995 for The Preacher.

In 1993 he was awarded the Wynne Prize for Open Cut, a painting of an old colliery in Queensland.

In 1997 Gittoes' contribution to Australia was recognised by the award of Member of the Order of Australia, "for service to art and international relations as an artist and photographer portraying the effects on the environment of war, international disasters and heavy industry".

In 2001, he was awarded the Centenary Medal, "for service as an internationally renowned artist".

In 2009, he was given an honorary doctorate in Letters by the University of New South Wales.

In 2011, Gittoes and Rose were invited to speak at the World Conference on Artistic Freedom of Expression in Oslo, Norway, about the Yellow House Jalalabad.

Gittoes twice received the Bassel Shehade Award for Social Justice from the Syracuse International Film Festival — in October 2013 for Snow Monkey (2015), and in 2018/9 for White Light).

Gittoes and Rose received the NSW Premiers Award in 2014 jointly for their Services to the Community, recognising the couples co founding of the Yellow House Jalalabad in Afghanistan and the Rockdale Yellow House in Arncliffe, New South Wales.

Gittoes was awarded the 2015 Sydney Peace Prize, in November 2025, for "exposing injustice for over 45 years as a humanist artist, activist and filmmaker, for his courage to witness and confront violence in the war zones of the world, for enlisting the arts to subdue aggression and for enlivening the creative spirit to promote tolerance, respect and peace with justice".

In 2019, a chapter about Gittoes, as well as many illustrations of his work, were included in the Australian War Memorial publication Control: Stories of Australian peacekeeping and humanitarian operations.

In 2021, Rose featured in Artist Profile arts magazine.

In 2025 Gittoes was presented with a Lifetime Achievement award by the Sydney Underground Film Festival.

Gittoes received honorary membership to the Australian Peacekeeper and Peacemaker Veterans' Association Inc., which holds a large archive of his photographs.

His puppet theatre made for Yellow House in 1971 was recreated for display in the Powerhouse Museum in Sydney.

Several of his films have been made available on SBS On Demand.

=== Film awards ===
- 2021: Best Australian Director, Melbourne International Documentary Festival, for No Bad Guys
- 2021: Best Documentary, Bridge of Peace Film Festival, for No Bad Guys

== Personal life ==
Gittoes first married art historian Gabrielle Dalton, who produced many of his early films, and later Hellen Rose, who has collaborated on most of his later films.

Rose, a feminist performance artist, singer, and actor, grew up in Wollongong. She earned a Bachelor of Visual Arts in 1997 at the University of Sydney, followed by a bachelor's degree and then a master's in teaching in 2001. In the 1990s, she worked with digital artist Linda Dement, co-creating an interactive CD-ROM called In My Gash in 1999.

Rose first met Gittoes in 1991, when she was 23, living in an artist-run collective in the Gunnery Building in Woolloomooloo, Sydney, and he was in his 30s and already married. They re-met later when Gittoes had separated from his wife, and they got together in 2007. She accompanied him to Ayubia, Pakistan in 2010, after turning up at the airport unannounced, and did much work with women in Yellow House Jalalabad. They bought their first home together in Werri Beach, NSW, in 2016, and married at their home in 2019.

She wrote that she has seen herself as a professional singer since she was 14 years old, and during the COVID-19 pandemic turned to classical singing again. During the COVID-19 lockdowns in NSW in 2020, Rose created a performance piece based on her work in Afghanistan called The Haunted Burqa Manifesto, and made a short film of it. In 2021, she created a Riot grrrl band called Soul Crime, which sang in multiple indigenous languages and in many different styles from around the world. They created a show to perform at festivals around the world as well as art performance venues such as the Oxford Art Factory for the 2022 Sydney Festival.

== Exhibitions ==
=== Solo exhibitions ===
- George Gittoes - Heavy industry, Wollongong City Gallery (8 May 1992 – 21 June 1992)
- George Gittoes: World Diary, multiple venues in NSW and Queensland (23 November 2000 – 8 July 2001)
- Witness to War, Station Museum of Contemporary Art, Houston, Texas (April 2011)
- White Light, Mitchell Fine Art, Brisbane (2019)
- George Gittoes: Ukraine Guernica, including the film Ukrainistan Artist War, Hazelhurst Arts Centre, southern Sydney (30 April – 23 June 2024); then at Deakin University Art Gallery (July – August 2024)

=== Group exhibitions ===
- The print, the press, the artist and the printer ... Limited Editions and Artists' Books from Art Presses of the ACT, Drill Hall Gallery [ANU] (1 October 1994 – 1 October 1994)
- The Counihan connection: Eight contemporary artists respond to the work of Noel Counihan, Counihan Gallery. (9 October 2009 – 8 November 2009)
- Brummels: Australia's first gallery of photography, Monash Gallery of Art (22 October 2011 – 22 January 2012)

== Collections ==
As of December 2025, the National Gallery of Australia holds 185 works by Gittoes.

Gittoes' 1971 etching with aquatint, The Hotel Kennedy Suite is held by the Art Gallery of Western Australia. It was gifted by Gittoes under the Commonwealth Government's Cultural Gifts Program in 2016.

Other galleries holding his work include:

- Art Gallery of New South Wales
- Museum and Art Gallery of the Northern Territory
- Powerhouse Museum
- Queensland Art Gallery

== Filmography ==
- Rainbow Way (1976)
- Refined Fire (1978)
- Wattamolla (1981)
- Unfound Land (1983)
- Tracks of the Rainbow (1982)
- Territory Trilogy:
  - Warriors and Lawmen (1984)
  - Unbroken Spirit (1985)
  - Frontier women (1985)
- Visions in the making (1987)
- Bullets of the poets (1987)
- War on Terror trilogy:
  - Soundtrack to War (2005); some scenes used in Michael Moore's film Fahrenheit 9/11 in the same year
  - Rampage (2006)
  - The Miscreants of Taliwood (2009)
- Love City, Jalalabad (2013)
- Snow Monkey (2015)
- White Light (2018)
- No Bad Guys (2021)
- Ukrainistan Artist War (2022?)
- Ukraine Guernica: Art Not War (2023)
- Yellow House Afghanistan (2024-5)
- Humanity in Danger (2024-5)
