= John Seward Johnson =

John Seward Johnson may refer to:

- John Seward Johnson I, founded the Harbor Branch Oceanographic Institution
- John Seward Johnson II, American artist
- John Seward Johnson III (born 1966), American filmmaker, philanthropist, and entrepreneur

== See also ==
- John Johnson (disambiguation)
