= Seward Johnson =

Seward Johnson may refer to:

- John Seward Johnson I (1895 – May 23, 1983), a.k.a. Seward Johnson and J. Seward Johnson
- John Seward Johnson II (1930 – March 10, 2020), a.k.a. J. Seward Johnson Jr. and Seward Johnson, American sculptor, son of the above
