= Hester Diamond =

American art collector, dealer, and interior designer (1928–2020)

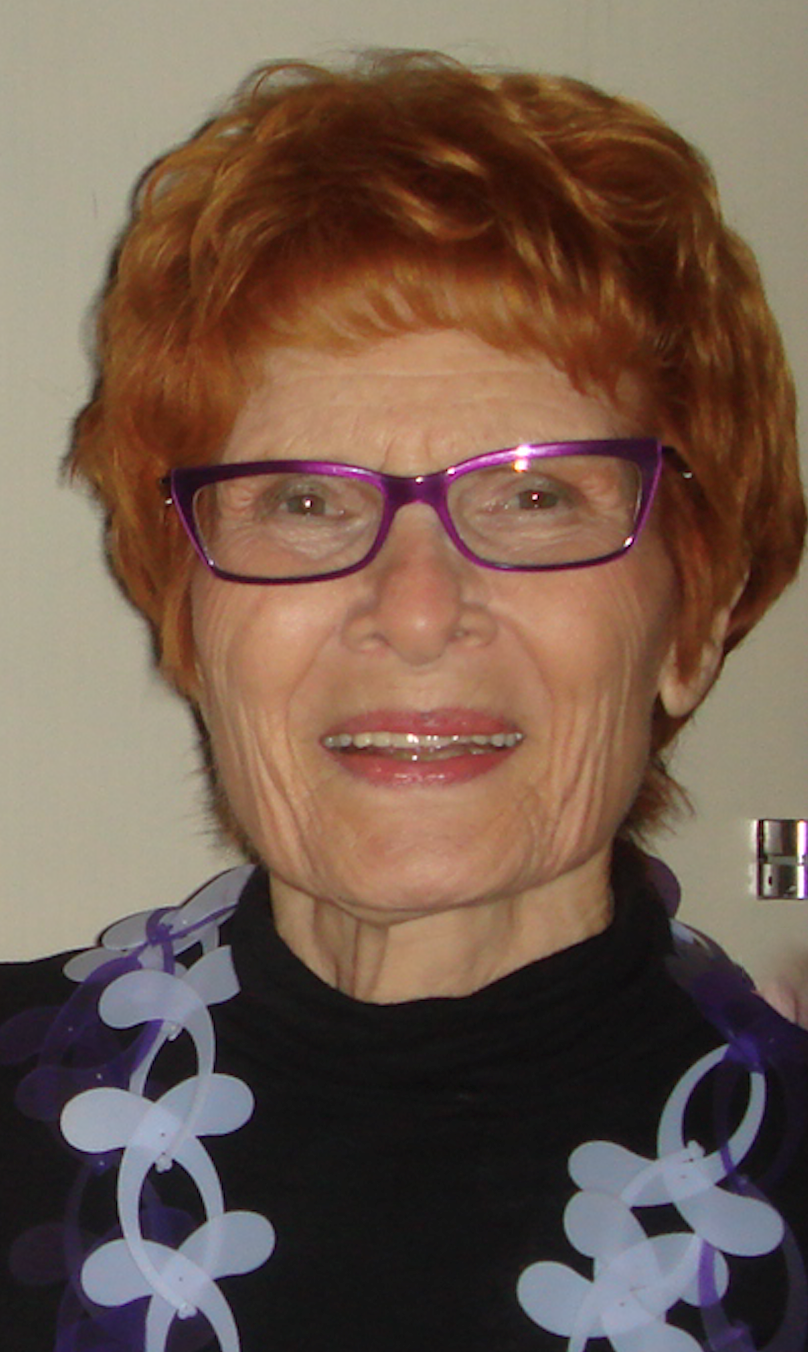
- Diamond in 2010
- Born: Hester Klein; December 10, 1928; New York City, U.S.
- Died: January 23, 2020 (aged 91); New York City, U.S.
- Education: Hunter College
- Occupations: Art collector Art dealer Interior designer

Hester Diamond (née Klein; December 10, 1928 – January 23, 2020) was an American art collector, dealer, and interior designer. With her first husband, Harold Diamond, she amassed a collection of Modernist art that the New York Times described as "astonishing". Following her husband's death, Diamond switched her focus to Old Masters, assembling "one of the greatest, most idiosyncratic art collections in America". She was the mother of Mike D of the Beastie Boys.

== Early life ==
Hester Klein was born in the Bronx to David Klein, from Bayonne, New Jersey, and Edith (Wilbur) Klein, a bookkeeper. Her parents were both Jewish; her father came from a German-speaking family from Hungary, and her mother's family came from Lithuania. An only child, she attended Hunter College High School, and often visited the Museum of Modern Art—her favorite museum—and the Guggenheim. She graduated from Hunter College in 1949 with a BA in English and became a secretary.

== Career ==
In 1950, she married Harold Diamond, a fourth-grade teacher in Harlem who was from the Bronx neighborhood she grew up in. A Columbia University graduate, he shared Hester's passion for art. They frequented Manhattan art galleries in their spare time, and in the early 1950s began working weekends at art dealer Martha Jackson's gallery. In 1955 they set up eight North American museum shows for the British sculptor Barbara Hepworth, arranging for each to purchase one Hepworth piece. They subsequently represented buyers for several private sales, and in 1959, after facilitating the sale of a Henry Moore sculpture for a $5,000 fee, Harold and Hester—by then a social worker—quit their jobs to focus on art full-time. They were noted for their discretion: Time reported that they worked with "the tact of a diplomat and the cunning of a spy." Becoming renowned as dealers as well as collectors, the Diamonds' personal collection included works by Picasso, Fernand Léger, Mondrian, Constantin Brâncuși, Mark Rothko, and Willem de Kooning.

In 1980, Diamond was asked by J. Seward Johnson, heir to the Johnson & Johnson fortune, to decorate an apartment he had purchased for his future wife Barbara ("Basia") Piasecka. Although she had no previous experience, Diamond said yes, and shortly thereafter started an interior design business. In a 2008 interview she said: "As a child of the Bronx, my design education came from going to the Museum of Modern Art. The design of that original building always inspired me. It was all about breaking symmetry." She continued her interior design work until 1989.

After Harold Diamond's death in 1982 she began to collect art by Old Masters. To finance her acquisitions, she sold significant pieces from her collection, including works by Henri Matisse, Picasso and Wassily Kandinsky. Her love of the Old Masters inspired her in 1995 to co-found the non-profit organizations the Medici Archive Project, which funds research for students and scholars on Renaissance and Baroque art, and in 2013, a publishing project for scholarship on Old Master sculpture, VISTAS (Virtual Images of Sculpture in Time and Space).

Diamond died in January 2020. In October 2020, Sotheby's announced Fearless: The Collection of Hester Diamond, an auction of 60 lots from Diamond's collection. In addition to contemporary work by artists such as Bill Viola, it included Baroque sculpture by Pietro and Gian Lorenzo Bernini (August) as well as work by Jörg Lederer, Girolamo della Robbia, Dosso Dossi, and Pieter Coecke van Aelst. The auction, which took place in January 2021, brought $26.7 million. The "extraordinarily rare-to-market" carved marble sculpture August sold for $8.9 million.

Diamond maintained a close relationship with the Metropolitan Museum of Art and made substantial gifts to the museum over the course of her lifetime.

== Personal life ==
In addition to Harold Diamond, Diamond was the widow of Ralph Kaminsky, an economics professor, and David S. Wilson, a psychoanalyst. She had one stepdaughter, three stepsons, and three sons: David, Mike, a founding member of the Beastie Boys, and Stephen, who died of neuroendocrine cancer in 1999. Her stepdaughter, Rachel Kaminsky, is an art dealer. She was formerly the head of Christie's Old Masters paintings department.

== Gallery ==
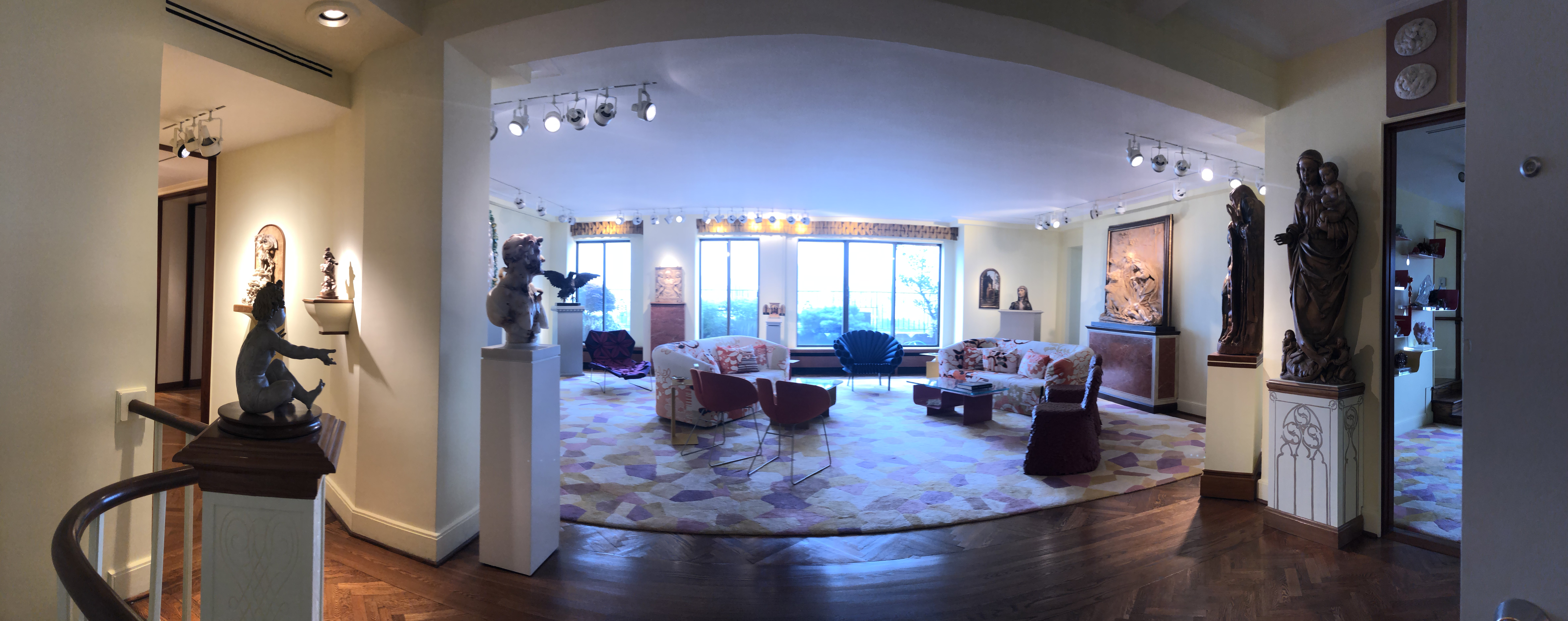
Entry hall and living room, designed by Hester Diamond
Diamond residence, Central Park West

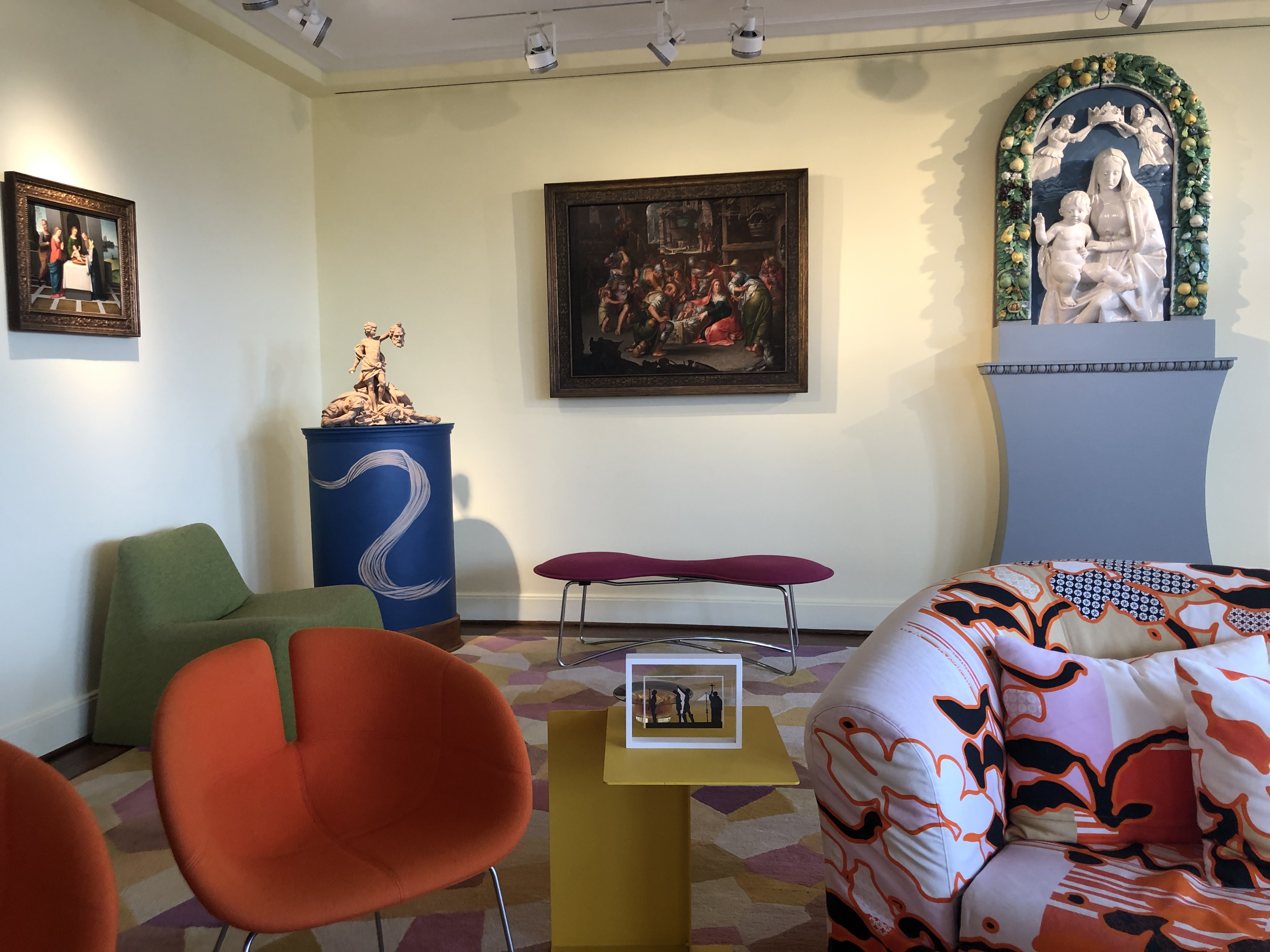
Living room, designed by Hester Diamond
Diamond residence, Central Park West

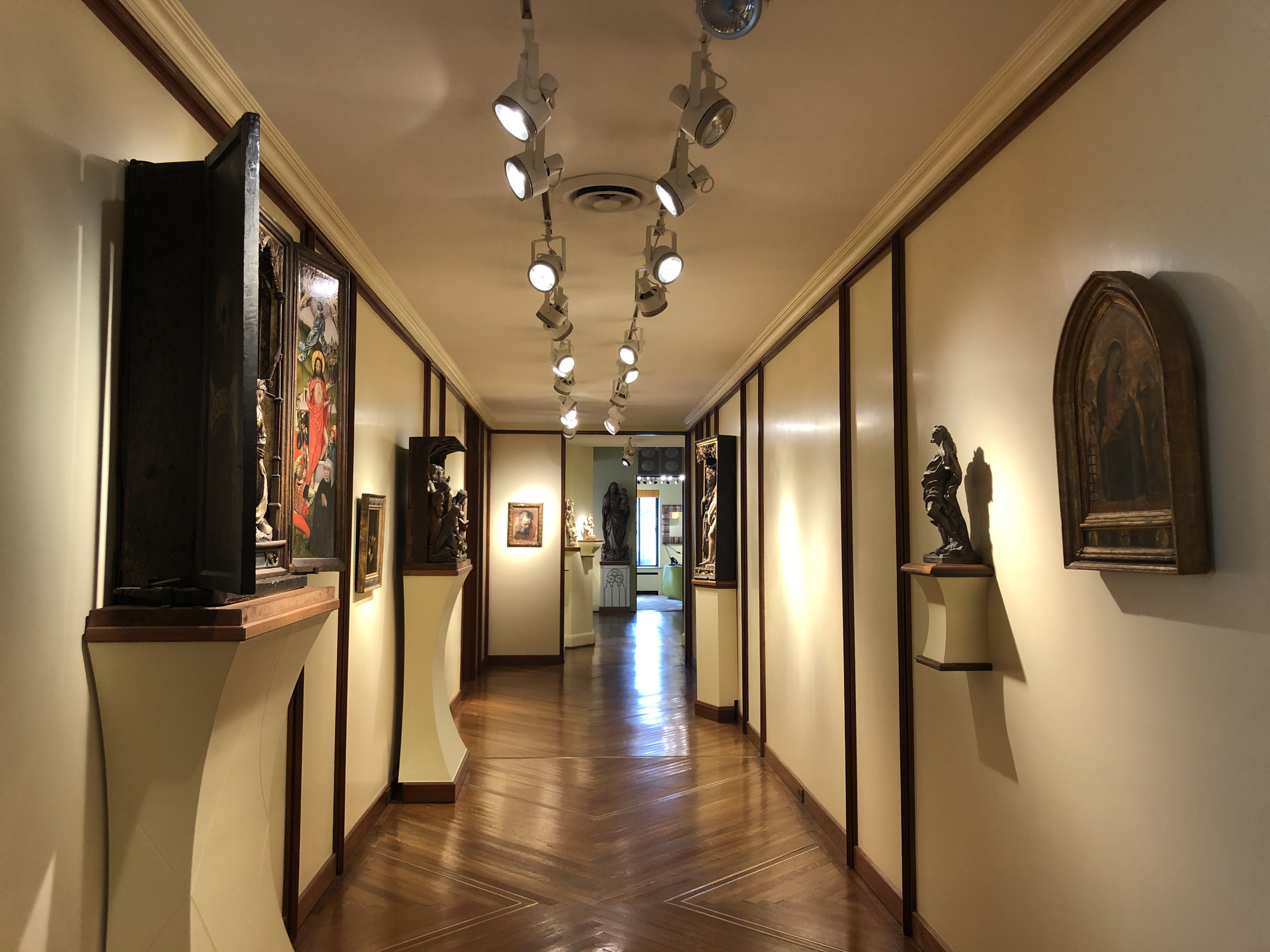
Hallway designed by Hester Diamond
Diamond residence, Central Park West

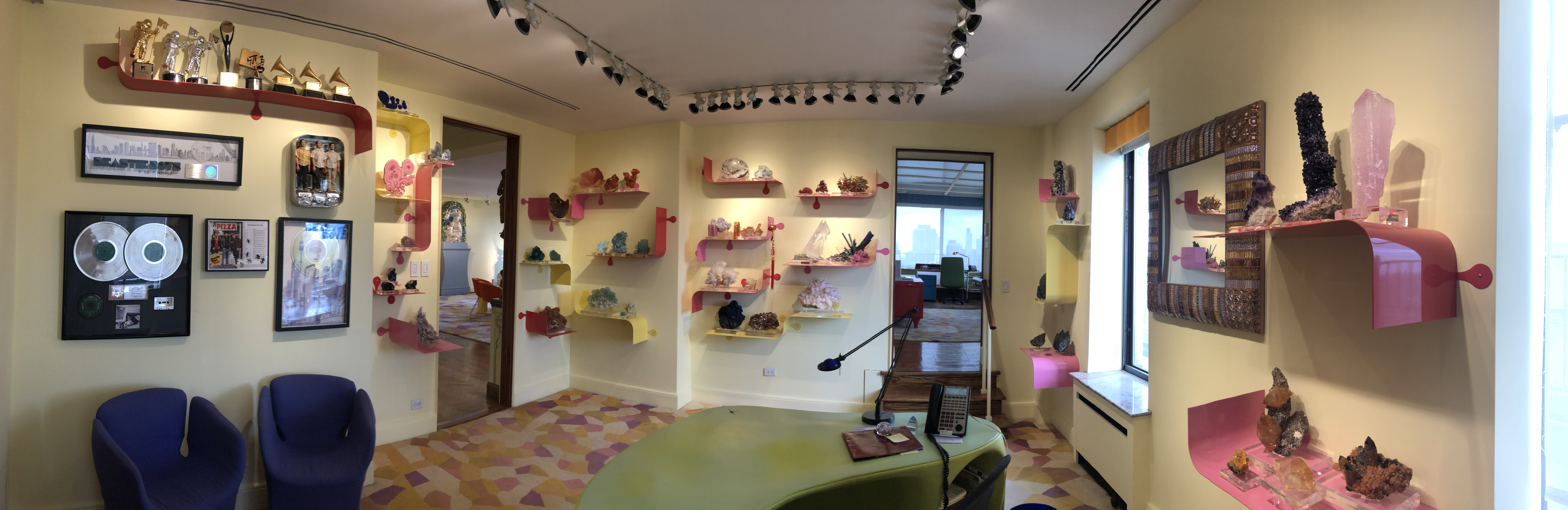
Office, designed by Hester Diamond
Diamond residence, Central Park West
