= Boat lift (disambiguation) =

A boat lift is a machine for transporting boats between water at two different elevations.

Boat lift or Boatlift may also refer to:

- The Boatlift, an album by rapper Pitbull
- Mariel boatlift, a mass emigration of Cubans for the United States, 1980
- The maritime response following the September 11 attacks on the World Trade Center, 2001
  - Boatlift: An Untold Tale of 9/11 Resilience, a 2011 documentary of the maritime response narrated by Tom Hanks
- Shiplift, a device to lift small watercraft above the water level at a dock for storage
