= Mary Lea Johnson Richards =

American theatre producer (1926–1990)

- Born: Mary Lea Johnson; August 20, 1926; New Brunswick, New Jersey, U.S.
- Died: May 3, 1990 (aged 63); Pittsburgh, Pennsylvania, U.S.
- Occupations: Entrepreneur, Broadway producer
- Known for: 1st Johnsons powder label baby
- Spouses: William Ryan (m. 19??; div. 19??); Victor D'Arc (m. 1972; div. 1978): Martin Richards (m. 19??)
- Children: 6
- Parent(s): John Seward Johnson I Ruth Dill Johnson

Mary Lea Johnson Richards (August 20, 1926 – May 3, 1990) was an American heiress, entrepreneur, and Broadway producer. She was a granddaughter of Robert Wood Johnson I (co-founder of Johnson & Johnson), and of Bermudan politician, soldier, and lawyer, Colonel Thomas Melville Dill. She was the first baby to appear on a Johnson's baby powder label.

== Early life ==
Johnson was born in New Brunswick, New Jersey. Her father was John Seward Johnson I, and her mother was Ruth Dill, the sister of actress Diana Dill; she was therefore first cousin of actor Michael Douglas. Johnson grew up with five siblings: Elaine Johnson, John Seward Johnson II, Diana Melville Johnson, Jennifer Underwood Johnson, and James Loring "Jimmy" Johnson. She was sexually abused by her father from age nine to fifteen. Her parents divorced around 1937, and her father remarried two years later, producing two half siblings, including Jimmy Johnson, which made her an aunt of film director Jamie Johnson. Johnson graduated from the Masters School in Dobbs Ferry, N.Y., and the New York Academy of Dramatic Arts.

== Career ==
Johnson was a founder and partner of Producer Circle, a film and theater production company, which produced Broadway shows such as Sweeney Todd, and Broadway producer.

== Personal life ==
Johnson was excluded from her father's will, which left the bulk of his fortune to Barbara Piasecka Johnson, her father's wife and former chambermaid. She and her siblings sued on grounds that their father wasn't mentally competent at the time he signed the will. It was settled out of court, and the children were granted about 12% of the fortune. During the largest inheritance battle in history, it was revealed that Johnson was a victim of incest.

Johnson's first marriage was to William Ryan, a press agent turned farmer. Before they divorced, the pair had six children: Eric Ryan, Seward Ryan, Hillary Ryan, Quentin Ryan, Roderick Newbold Ryan, and Alice Ryan Marriott.

In 1972, she married Dr. Victor D'Arc, a bisexual psychiatrist, whom she met while seeking treatment for her son's drug addiction. In 1976, she claimed that her estranged husband had had homosexual affairs and lured her into threesomes with other men, including the chauffeur. According to Johnson, D'Arc hired hitmen to have her murdered. Johnson, who was living with gay Broadway producer Marty Richards, hired a bodyguard. Two intruders broke into their apartment. According to Richards, “We were almost killed in our sleep,.... they hit our bodyguard, he had blood all over his head, he chased them.” Subsequently, the Bronx D.A's office made a case, and opened an investigation. No charges were brought, and D'Arc and Johnson divorced in 1978.

Johnson's third marriage would be to Richards, and last until her death. Her family had a twelve-year-long court battle regarding her husband's eligibility for a share of the Johnson & Johnson fortune. The court ruled in favor of Richards.

In 1990, Johnson died of liver cancer at the age of 63. The NYU Mary Lea Johnson Richards Organ Transplantation Center is named after her. Mary is buried in Locust Valley Cemetery, Locust Valley, New York.

== See also ==
- Johnson v. Johnson (1988, ISBN 0-440-20041-5)
- Undue Influence: The Epic Battle for the Johnson & Johnson Fortune (1993, ISBN 0-688-06425-6)
