= Hudson Riverfront 9/11 Memorial =

Memorial in Weehawken, New Jersey, United States

Coordinates: 40.772666°N 74.010829°W

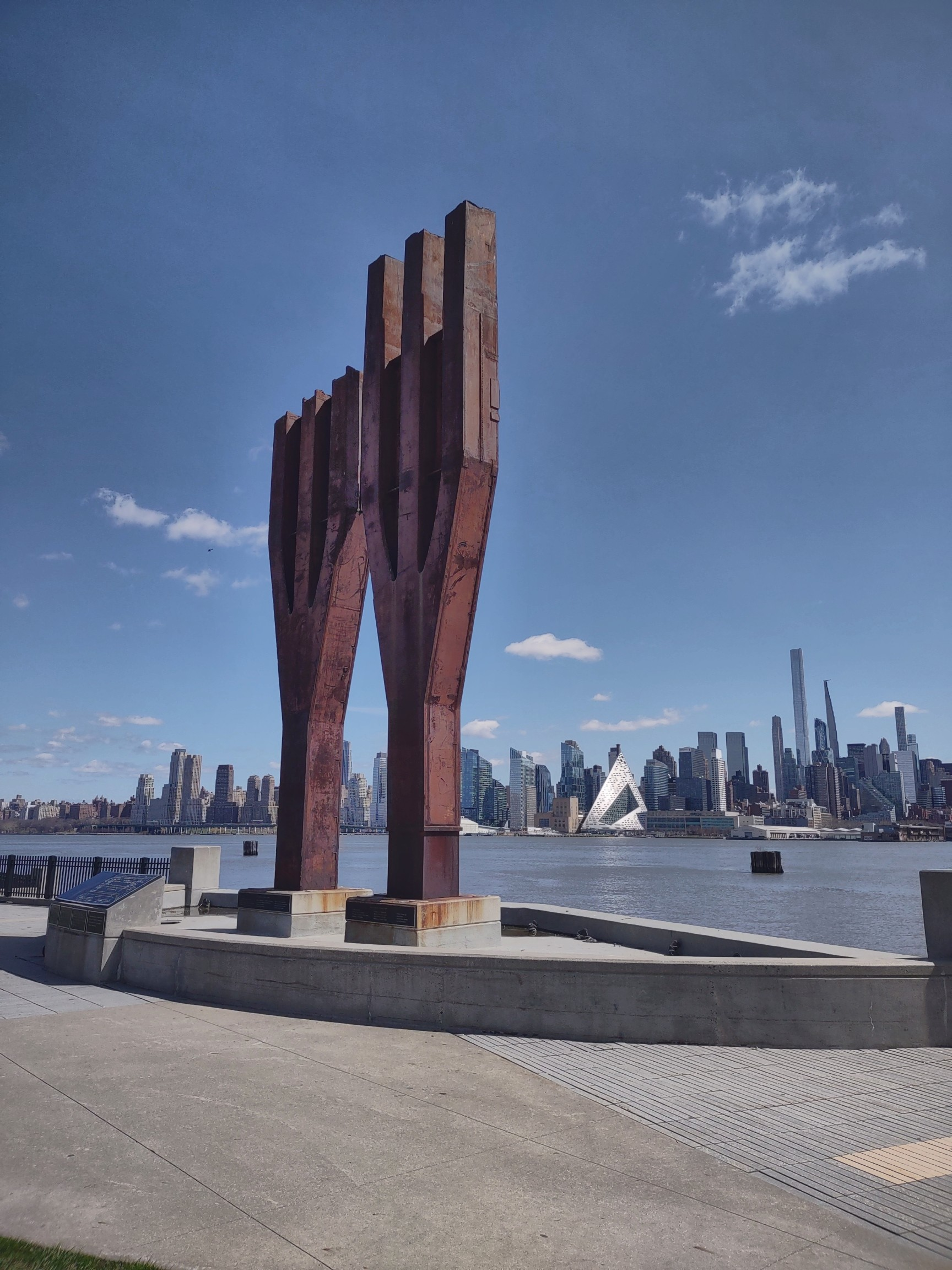
- Year: 2011 (dedicated September 7)
- Type: Steel
- Dimensions: 9.1 m (30 ft)
- Location: Hudson River Walkway; Weehawken, New Jersey

The Hudson Riverfront 9/11 Memorial, also known as the Weehawken 9/11 Memorial, is a memorial in Weehawken, New Jersey. It commemorates the '9/11 boat lift', the emergency rescue response, and those who perished (including five Weehawken residents) in the aftermath the September 11 attacks of the World Trade Center in 2001. It is located on the Hudson River Waterfront Walkway at the site of triage which had been set up on the left bank of Hudson River and was dedicated ten years after the events of that day.

== Description ==
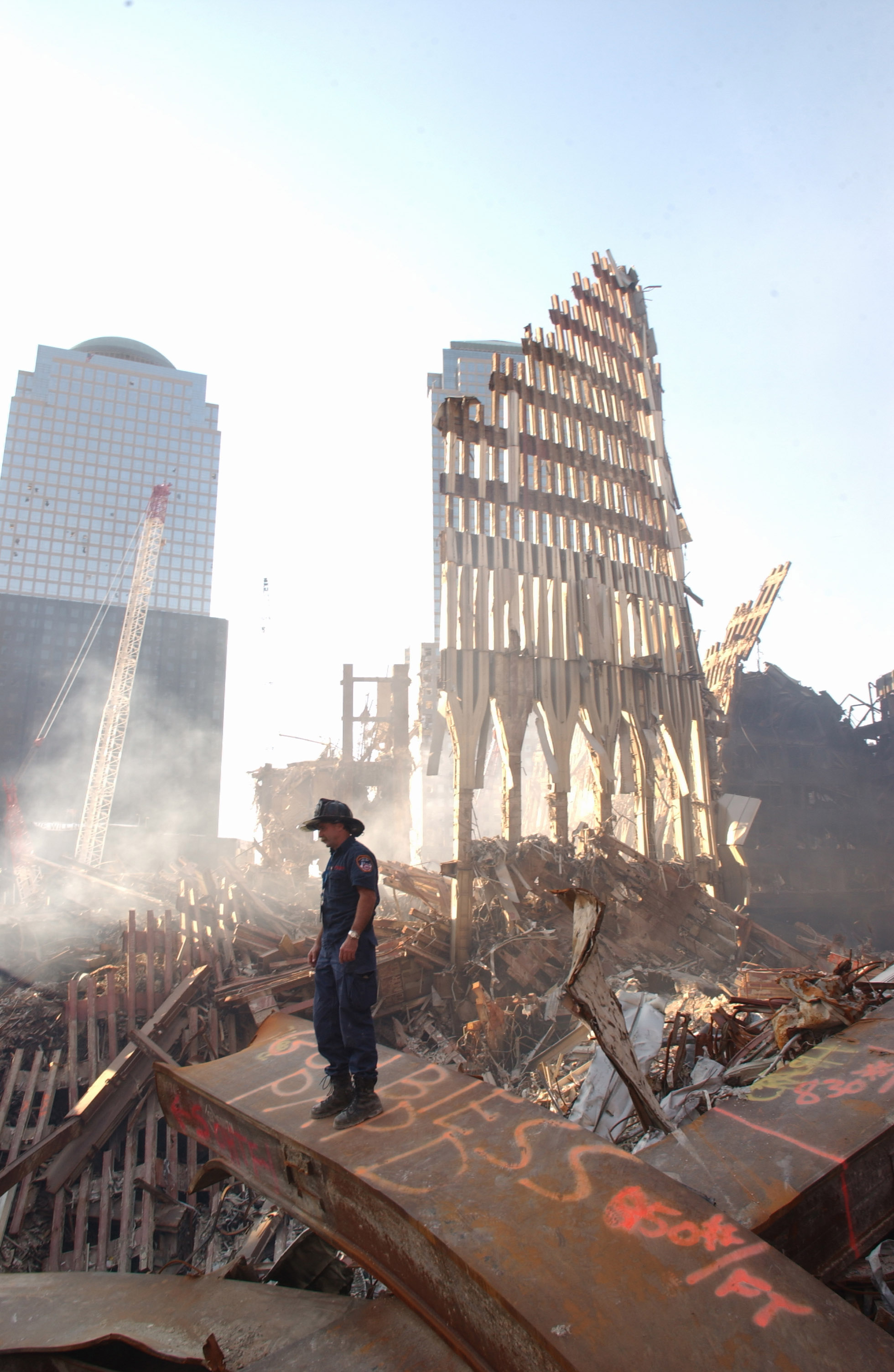
Eastern facade of north tower (1 WTC) in 2001

The memorial includes two trident-shaped beams recovered from the World Trade Center (WTC) set vertically into an infinity pool, a fountain, and a commemorative plaque. The beams stand 30 feet (9.1 m) feet tall and at the top are 8 feet (2.4 m) wide. They weigh 50,000 pounds. They serve as visual reference to the parts of the buildings that withheld and outlasted the damage; Seating at the oval shaped park orients the viewer to the site of the former buildings in Lower Manhattan.

=== Tridents ===
An iconic architectural feature of the exterior of the WTC were the three-pronged decorative and structural elements at its base, commonly referred to as "tridents", for their three-tine fork-like shape. The tridents were formed by massive steel beams rising from the base of the towers along the exterior walls. At the seventh story, the aluminum-clad beams divided into three smaller beams that continued to the 110th floor of each tower. They were produced by Lukens Steel Company, and nicknamed "trees". After the attacks, several sections of the towers' lower facade remained standing. They were eventually dismantled and stored in Hangar 17 at JFK Airport along with other artifacts. The beams had to be cut into lengths of 30 feet (9.1 m) to fit onto trucks to be carted off the WTC site.

One trident is at the entrance of the Terrorist Screening Center in Vienna, Virginia. Two of the tridents have been re-assembled in the interior of the National September 11 Memorial & Museum. Others have been returned to Coatesville, Pennsylvania, where they were manufactured, as a memorial at the National Iron and Steel Heritage Museum.

=== Inscription ===
The inscription includes a quote from President John F. Kennedy:

"The courage of life is often a less dramatic spectacle than the courage of a final moment; but it is no less a magnificent mixture of triumph and tragedy."

== Significance ==
Thousands of people were transported across the Hudson River by commercial ferry boats, tug boats, police and fire boats and passenger vessels in the maritime evacuation of Lower Manhattan. Hundreds, including injured emergency personnel, office workers and civilians, were severely burned, injured or emotionally traumatized. The memorial's location near Weehawken Port Imperial was a site where approximately 60,000 people were brought (mostly by NY Waterway and Circle Line Sightseeing Cruises boats) and a triage was quickly established.

== Hudson River Walkway 9/11 memorials ==
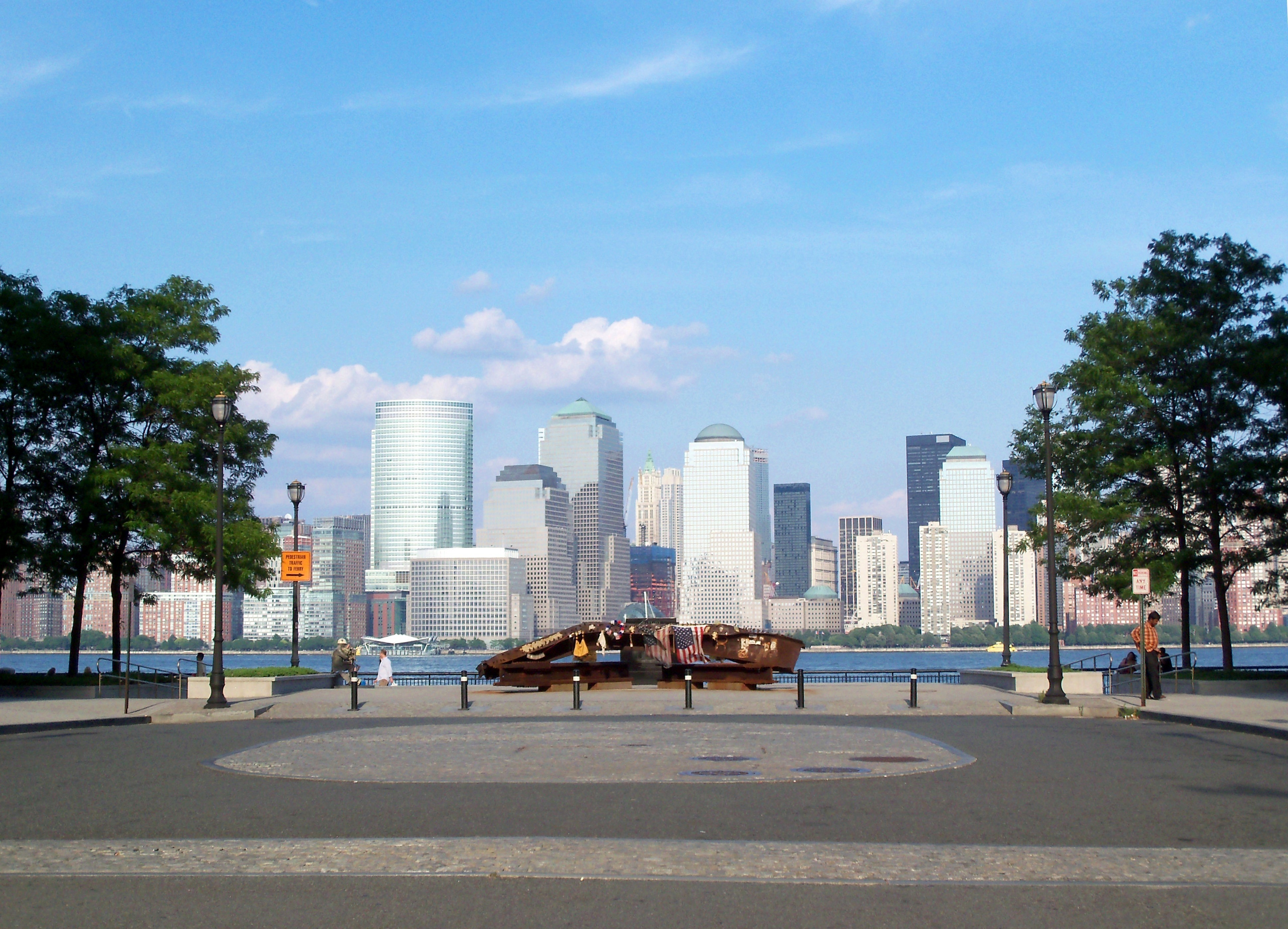
Paulus Hook, Jersey City

There are other memorials along the Hudson River Waterfront Walkway, namely at Pier A, Hoboken, the Jersey City 9/11 Memorial at Paulus Hook/Exchange Place, Empty Sky at Liberty State Park, and To the Struggle Against World Terrorism in Bayonne.

== See also ==
- National September 11 Memorial & Museum
- Memorials and services for the September 11 attacks
