= Jersey City 9/11 Memorial =

Memorial to 9/11 in Jersey City

Coordinates: 40°42′53.4″N 74°01′59.8″W

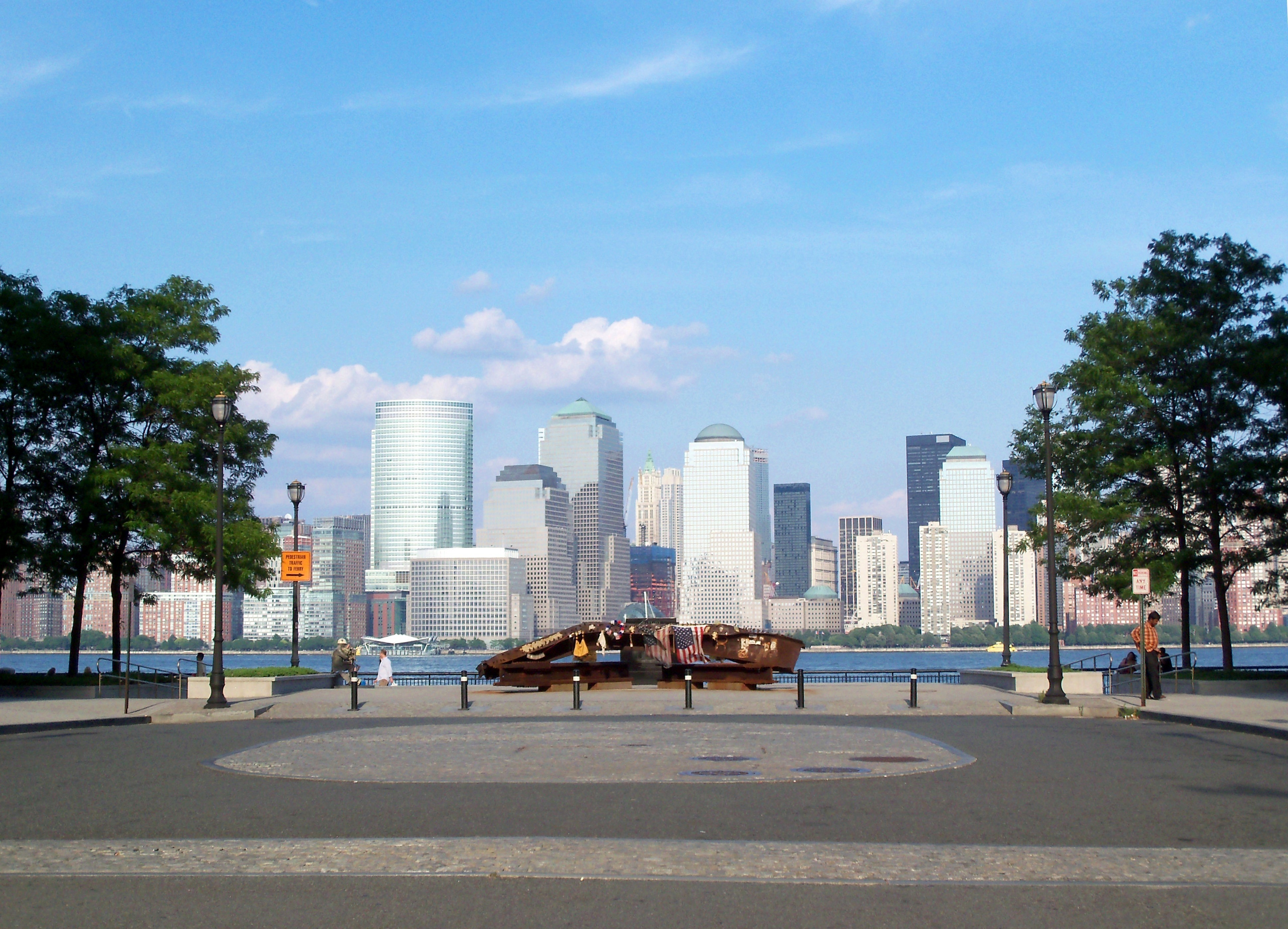
- Memorial in 2010
- Year: 2002, 2004
- Location: Hudson River Walkway Jersey City, New Jersey

The Jersey City 9/11 Memorial is located on the Hudson River Waterfront Walkway at the foot of Grand Street in Paulus Hook near Exchange Place in Jersey City, New Jersey. It comprises three components: a sculpture of steel girders from the original World Trade Center, an inscribed black granite stele, and Makeshift Memorial. The site on the Hudson Waterfront opposite the World Trade Center site was a triage set up during the '9/11 boatlift' and thereafter became a staging area for rescue operations.

== Steel girders and stele ==
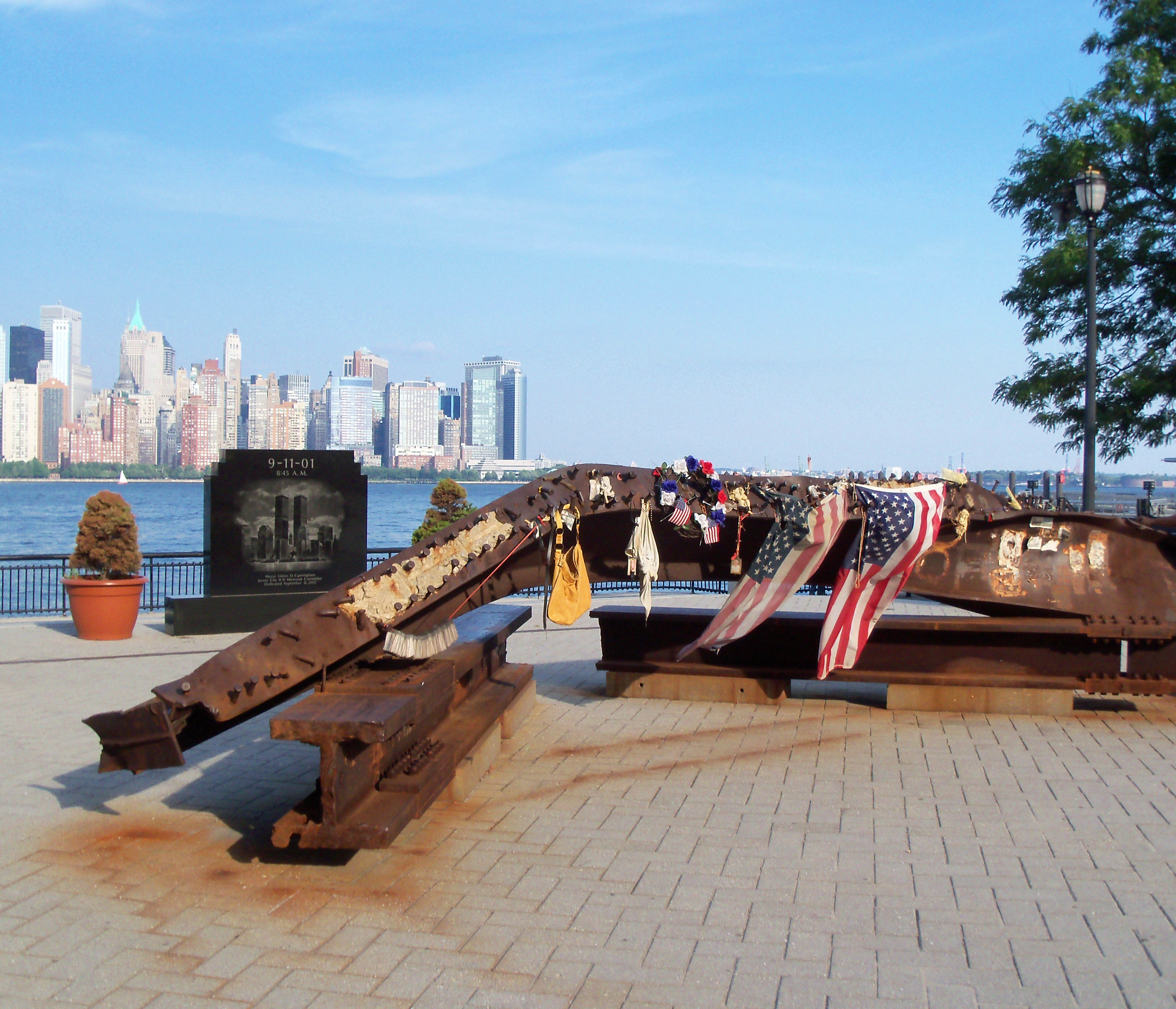
Steel girders and stele in 2010

Dedicated in 2002 by then-mayor Glenn Cunningham, the six steel girders are welded into the form of the letter "A" (when seen from above) to represent "America". The mangled cross beam is marked number "8".

The black granite stele is dedicated to all victims of the September 11 attacks. The river facing side is inscribed the names of the 38 Jersey City residents who perished and with certain light reflects the Lower Manhattan skyline. The facing sign is an engraving of the original World Trade Center above which is inscribed September 11, 2001. An inscription reads: On the morning of September 11, 2001, these Jersey City residents were killed during the attack on the World Trade Center. This memorial is dedicated to those who died, those who survived, and those whose lives where changed forever on that day.

== Makeshift Memorial ==
Makeshift Memorial
- Artist: John Seward Johnson II
- Year: 2004
- Type: Brass
- Location: Hudson River Walkway Jersey City, New Jersey

Makeshift Memorial was created by sculptor John Seward Johnson II. It is an adapted 2nd casting of his Double Check sculpture, which was originally installed at Liberty Plaza in Lower Manhattan in 1982. In the aftermath of the September 11, 2001 attacks rescue workers came upon the figure in the rubble, only to discover it wasn't a person but a statue. In the days and weeks afterwards, Double Check became a makeshift memorial covered in flowers and tributes. Moved by the tributes, Johnson recalled the copy which had been on display in Germany on 9/11 and returned to the U.S. via Rome where it was turned into a memorial for Italians to leave notes of support.

The sculpture was placed in 2004. The adjacent plaque explains: "Rescue workers in the aftermath of the September 11, 2001 tragedy got their only smile of the day with a "victim" lifted from the rubble turned out to be a bronze sculpture by artist Seward Johnson. "Double Check" was set amid the wreckage, becoming a makeshift memorial, as flowers and heartbreaking remembrances soon covered the piece. Deeply moved, Johnson reverently collected all the messages of love and pain, cast them in bronze, and welded them to the piece exactly as he had found them one month after the tragedy."

== Hudson River Walkway 9/11 memorials ==
There are other 9/11 memorials along the Hudson River Waterfront Walkway.

At the nearby Katyń Memorial a plaque was unveiled on the front side of the pediment on September 12, 2004 inscribed with: NEVER FORGET! PRAY FOR ALL THE INNOCENT VICTIMS AND HEROES WHO DIED IN THE TERRORIST ATTACK ON AMERICA SEPTEMBER 11, 2001

Others are the Hudson Riverfront 9/11 Memorial in Weehawken, at Pier A, Hoboken, Empty Sky at Liberty State Park, and To the Struggle Against World Terrorism in Bayonne.

== See also ==
- List of public art in Jersey City, New Jersey
- National September 11 Memorial & Museum
- Memorials and services for the September 11 attacks
