= Double check (disambiguation) =

Double check may refer to:

- Double check, a chess term; check delivered by two pieces simultaneously
- Double Check, a sculpture by John Seward Johnson II
- Double Check (novel), a novel in the Traces series
- Double-checked locking, a software design pattern
- Double check valve, a backflow prevention design
