= Allow Me =

Sculpture by John Seward Johnson II

- Umbrella Man
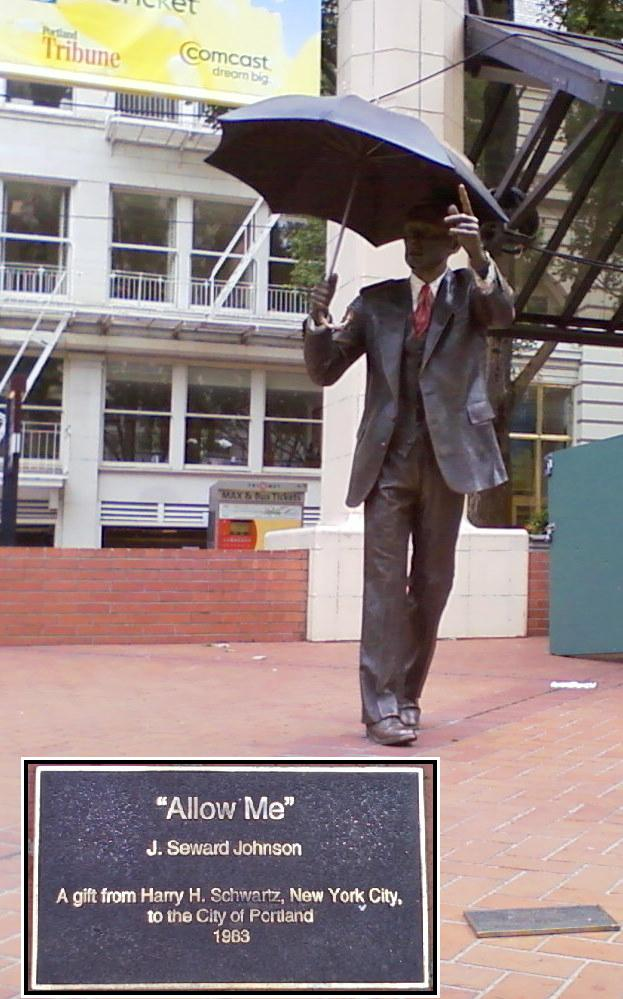
- Allow Me and (inset) the descriptive plaque mounted in the brickwork of Portland, Oregon's Pioneer Courthouse Square
- Artist: John Seward Johnson II
- Year: 1983
- Type: Bronze sculpture
- Medium: Bronze; aluminum; stainless steel
- Dimensions: 210 cm × 110 cm × 130 cm (82 in × 45 in × 50 in)
- Weight: 460 lb (210 kg)
- Location: Portland, Oregon; 45°31′07″N 122°40′46″W
- Owner: City of Portland and Multnomah County Public Art Collection courtesy of the Regional Arts & Culture Council

Allow Me is a bronze sculpture by John Seward Johnson II. There are casts displayed as public art in Bath, New York; Chicago; in front of the Prince Music Theater in Philadelphia; on Embassy Row (2346 Massachusetts Ave. NW) in Washington, D.C.; and in Portland, Oregon. Three additional casts exist in private collections in Fort Smith, Arkansas, Hamilton, Ohio, and Los Angeles.

The statue in Portland, which is also known as Umbrella Man, is installed at Pioneer Courthouse Square. It was donated anonymously to the City of Portland in 1984 for display in the square. The sculpture depicts a life-sized man dressed in a business suit, hailing a cab and holding an umbrella. Constructed from bronze, aluminum and stainless steel, the sculpture stands six feet, ten inches tall and weighs 460 pounds. It is one of many works of art generated by the city's Percent for Art program, and is considered part of the City of Portland and Multnomah County Public Art Collection courtesy of the Regional Arts & Culture Council.

After ten years, in 1995, the sculpture was removed from its pedestal and transferred to California for its first major restoration. To maintain its shine, Allow Me receives cold wax coatings every year. It is a popular tourist attraction and local landmark which serves as a reference point for gatherings, or political rallies. Allow Me has received a positive reception and is renowned for its realistic appearance; the 'Umbrella Man' has been called the "most photographed man in Portland", and serves as a symbol of the city and its residents.

== Description and history ==
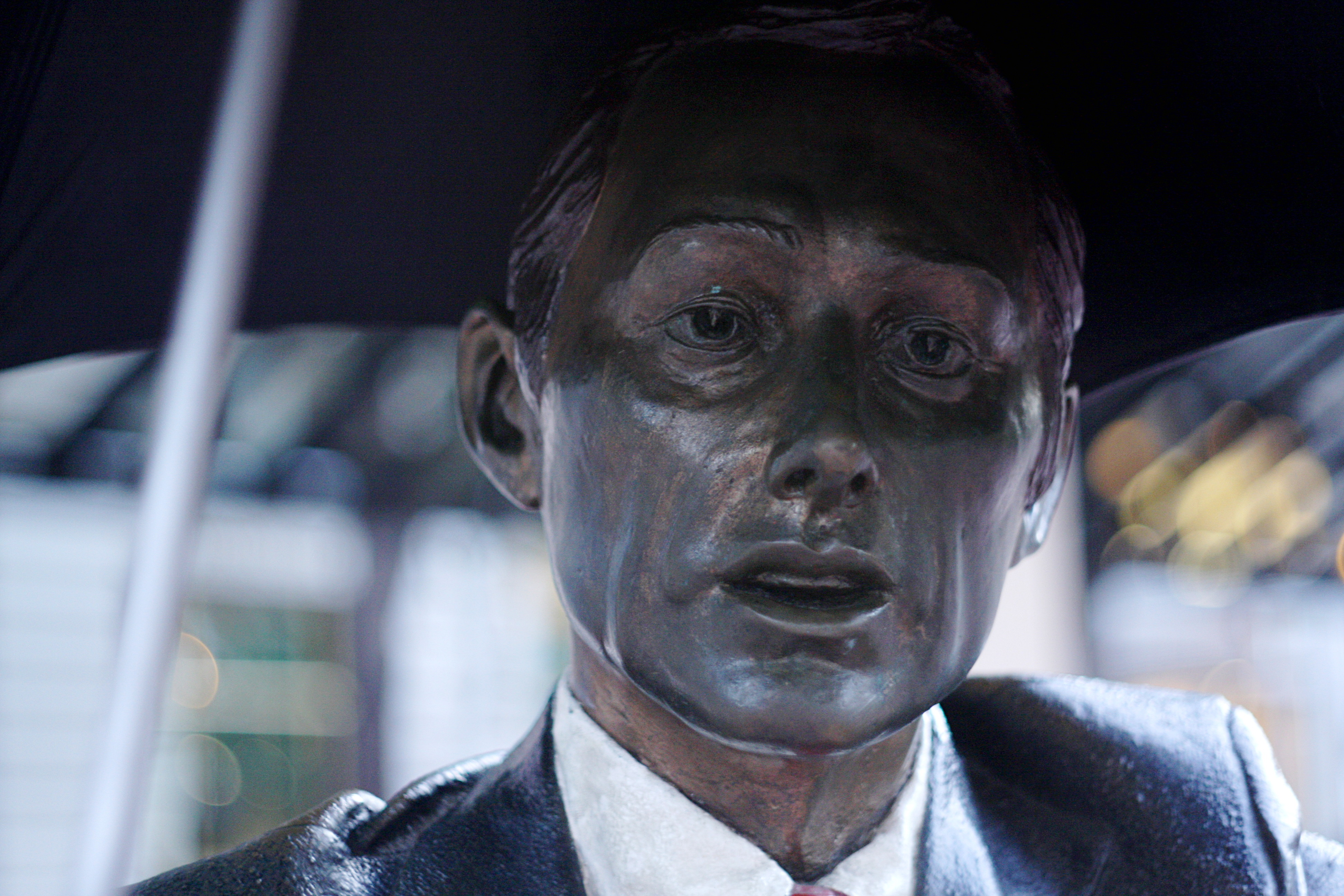
Detail of the statue in Portland, Oregon

The Portland sculpture is one of seven casts of John Seward Johnson II's Allow Me. It was designed and completed by Johnson in 1983 and is constructed from bronze, aluminum and stainless steel. In 1984, the sculpture was donated anonymously, but in the name of Harry H. Schwartz, to the City of Portland and dedicated for display at Pioneer Courthouse Square. This square is one of the most popular and often visited squares in the state of Oregon. In 2004 the square was named the fourth best public square in the world by New York's Project for Public Spaces. Allow Me is situated on the south side of the Square just above the amphitheatre and is seen as welcoming visitors there. The sculpture depicts a life-sized man dressed in a business suit, "hurrying across the square" and hailing a cab. He holds an umbrella, which some people have interpreted as an offering. He wears a watch and a rhubarb-colored tie; his index finger points towards the Meier & Frank Building, adjacent to the Square. Allow Me measures 82" x 45" x 50" and weighs 460 pounds. The sculpture is part of the City of Portland and Multnomah County Public Art Collection courtesy of the Regional Arts & Culture Council. It is one of many works of art generated by Portland's Percent for Art program.

In July 1995, the sculpture was removed from its pedestal and shipped to Stellar Artworks in Van Nuys, California for cleaning and restoration. It received a glassbead peening to remove the effects of birds, human hands, pollution and precipitation, plus a coat of incralac, a lacquer-based acrylic resin coating. The restoration was funded by an anonymous donor and involved Art Work Fine Art Services, Industrial Craters & Packers, O'Neill Transfer Co., Smith Masonry Contractors and the Regional Arts & Culture Council. This marked the sculpture's first restoration since 1985. Allow Me receives cold wax coatings each year to maintain its shine.

The sculpture has been used as a reference point for gatherings. There have been instances when the sculpture was used to make a statement or act as a prop. In 2011, Occupy Portland demonstrators outfitted Allow Me with a peace sign, a Guy Fawkes mask and a "We are the 99%" sign.

The statue was vandalized in 2020.

== Reception ==
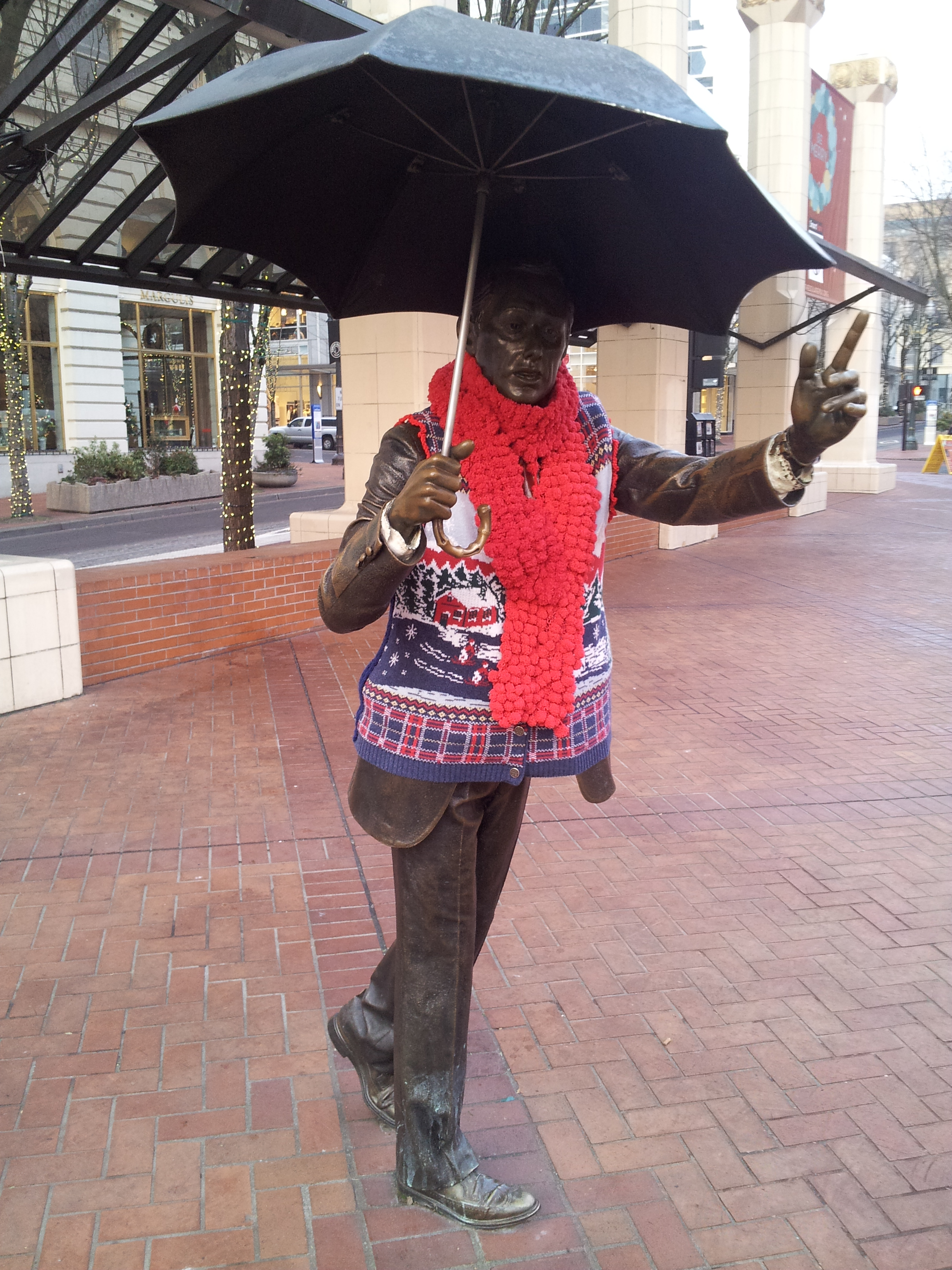
Allow Me in Portland, dressed in winter clothing in December 2013

The Architecture Foundation of Oregon called the sculpture a "popular icon" for Portland. 'cultureNOW' suggested that the depicted subject could be the "most photographed man in Portland"; the project described Allow Me as one of the "most recognized and beloved" sculptures in Portland, serving as a symbol of the city for both residents and tourists. Elaine S. Friedman, contributor to The Oregon Encyclopedia, wrote that Allow Me mimics Portland's pedestrians. In its guide of Portland's public art and architecture, Moon Publications described the sculpture as being "so realistic that you'll look twice". Another description by Portland Community College asserted that the work is so lifelike that people have attempted to initiate conversation with the 'Umbrella Man'. Spencer Heinz of The Oregonian wrote that the sculpture "serves for some as a symbol of the civility that frames the city's incomplete image of itself."

In 2011, Sunday Parkways presented spoke cards to donors depicting the sculpture, among four additional cards showing other iconic images of the city. In Willamette Week's annual "Best of Portland" feature for 2011, the "Best Portland Tattoo" award went to one resident whose Portland-themed sleeve tattoo included Allow Me, among its other landmarks.

== See also ==
- 1983 in art
- List of public art in Chicago
- List of public art in Philadelphia
- Weather Machine, a kinetic sculpture also located in Pioneer Courthouse Square
