= Forman School =

Location
- 12 Norfolk Road; Litchfield, Connecticut 06759; United States; 41°45′17″N 73°11′27″W

Information
- Type: Boarding school, day school
- Established: 1930 (96 years ago)
- CEEB code: 070350
- Headmaster: Amy Clemons
- Faculty: 60
- Grades: 9-12, post-graduate
- Enrollment: 230
- Colors: Green and gold
- Mascot: Lions
- Website: www.formanschool.org

The Forman School is a co-educational boarding and day school in Litchfield, Connecticut, United States offering a college preparatory program in grades 9 to 12 and a postgraduate program (PG) exclusively for students with learning differences such as ADD/ADHD and dyslexia. Forman School offers a 4-week summer program in July for students with learning differences.

== History ==
The school was founded in 1930 by John and Julie Ripley Forman, with three students who hadn't had a history of academic success in a traditional setting. The school grew over the years into an alternative high school for students, and in recent years, with so many new programs for students, has seen 100% college acceptance. All accepted students present with developmental or language-based disabilities, most notably dyslexia, attention deficit disorders (ADHD), and executive function disorders.

The Formans were committed to using the best resources to address the specific learning differences of their students, a tradition that has continued throughout the school's history. They turned to Samuel Orton, a pioneer in reading methodologies to determine how to teach the fundamentals of reading. The Formans established the Remedial English Department and employed the Orton-Gillingham method of teaching reading phonics. They were also awarded a grant from the Rockefeller Foundation to conduct research in teaching reading.

As a graduate of Princeton University, one of John Forman's contacts was Professor Albert Einstein who had significant learning disabilities. This relationship led to Einstein joining the Forman School's Academic Board of Advisors in the early years. After John died Julie asked her brother Dillon Ripley to join the Board. Ripley served as secretary of the Smithsonian Institution for 20 years.

In the 1980s, Forman was the subject of a Time magazine profile highlighting its success with dyslexic people. Additionally, Forman was featured in The New York Times for its curriculum in the 1980s and its Costa Rican Rainforest Project in the 1990s.

Mark B. Perkins, a former dean of students at Holderness School, was head of Forman from 1995 to 2008. At that tumultuous time, he steadied the school and contributed mightily to building a strong student culture and competitive athletic program. In November 2007, Adam K. Man, academic dean at St. Timothy's School was appointed the next head of school and assumed the position on July 1, 2008. In July 2024, Amy Clemons started her tenure as Head of School.

== Athletics ==
Athletics at Forman are an integral part of community life. All students have the option to participate in either a competitive interscholastic league or recreational sport. Forman competes with schools in the Housatonic Valley Athletic League and the Hudson Valley Athletic League.

Forman offers a teacher/coach model in which classroom teachers have the opportunity to work with students on the playing fields, thereby expanding the understanding and support that has proven to increase success and confidence in both areas. All Forman coaches are certified by the Positive Coaching Alliance.

Sports offered include alpine ski team, baseball, softball, basketball, crew, cross-country, dance, equestrian, football, golf, sailing, ice hockey, kayaking, lacrosse, recreational skiing, rock climbing, snowboarding, soccer, tennis, ultimate frisbee, volleyball, and wrestling.

== Notable people ==
=== Alumni ===
- Mitchell Block, Academy Award-winning producer (Big Mama) and Academy Award nominated filmmaker (Poster Girl)
- David Rublin, bass player of American Authors
- John Seward Johnson II, bronze sculptor
- Blake Miller, professional lacrosse player, Long Island Lizards

=== Former faculty ===
- Joe Bouchard, founding member of the Blue Öyster Cult
