= Martin Richards (producer) =

American film producer (1932–2012)

- Born: Morton Richard Klein; March 11, 1932; The Bronx, New York City, U.S.
- Died: November 26, 2012 (aged 80); Manhattan, New York City, U.S.
- Occupation: Film producer
- Years active: 1971–2012
- Spouse: Mary Lea Johnson Richards
- Awards: Academy Award for Best Picture; 2003 Chicago; Tony Award for Best Musical; 1979 Sweeney Todd: The Demon Barber of Fleet Street; 1984 La Cage aux Folles; 1991 The Will Rogers Follies; Tony Award for Best Revival of a Musical; 2005 La Cage aux Folles

Martin Richards (born Morton Richard Klein; March 11, 1932 – November 26, 2012) was a producer of Broadway musicals and American films.

== Biography ==
Richards was born to Sidney "Sid" Klein, a stockbroker, and his wife, Shirley, and was raised just off the Grand Concourse in the Bronx. He had a younger brother named Bruce, and his parents also owned an arcade on the Keansburg Amusement Park in the 1940s. His friends and the friends of his brother always knew he was destined for a career linked to Broadway as he sang show tunes to them as kids.

== Career ==
Richards won an Arthur Godfrey talent search, then appeared on The Ed Sullivan Show and at the Copacabana. He later became a casting director, then a Broadway theatre and film producer.

As a Broadway producer, Richards won three Tony Awards for Best Musical and one Tony Award for Best Revival of a Musical, out of 10 nominations. He won the Best Picture Academy Award for Chicago, having optioned film rights to Miramax in 1991.

== Personal life ==
Despite being gay, Richards became the third husband of Johnson & Johnson heiress and producer Mary Lea Johnson Richards; reportedly, the couple "adored each other". Despite the times being different back then, Richards' friends knew who he was and that he was different and they accepted it and loved him just the same. In his youth Richards and his parents spent their summers in Keansburg, New Jersey where his parents owned a summer business.

Prior to their marriage, Johnson had been married to bisexual child psychiatrist Dr. Victor D'Arc, who she claimed in 1976 had conspired with his homosexual lover to hire a hitman and murder her; a bodyguard was beaten almost to death during a break-in that almost killed Johnson and Richards. Although the Bronx district attorney opened an investigation, no charges were ultimately brought, and the pair divorced in 1978.

Johnson predeceased Richards in 1990, leaving him a $50 million fortune. Johnson's family waged a twelve-year court battle seeking to render Richards ineligible for a share of the Johnson & Johnson fortune. The court ruled in favor of Richards. In memory of his late wife, Richards created the New York Center for Children to care for abused children and their families. Known to throw lavish parties, he was close to Chita Rivera, who hosted a tribute to Richards on April 8, 2013, at the Edison Ballroom to benefit the center.

He was also notable for physically assaulting "Stuttering" John Melendez at an event in 1996 while the latter was working for The Howard Stern Show.

== Death ==
Richards died from liver cancer at his home in Manhattan on November 26, 2012, at age 80. The marquees of Broadway theatres were dimmed in his memory the night of November 27, 2012 at 7 p.m. Martin is buried in Locust Valley Cemetery, Locust Valley, New York.

== Filmography ==
- Some of My Best Friends Are... (producer – as Marty Richards) 1971
- Fun and Games (producer – as Marty Richards) 1973
- The Image (producer – as Marty Richards) 1975
- The Boys from Brazil (producer) 1978
- The Shining (associate producer: The Producer Circle Organization) 1980
- Fort Apache, The Bronx (producer) 1981
- Chicago (producer) 2002

== Broadway Awards ==
Year	Title	Category	Result
1976	Chicago	Best Musical	Nominated
1978	On the Twentieth Century	Best Musical	Nominated
1979	Sweeney Todd	Best Musical	Won
1982	Crimes of the Heart	Best Play	Nominated
1984	La Cage aux Folles	Best Musical	Won
1990	Grand Hotel	Best Musical	Nominated
1991	The Will Rogers Follies	Best Musical	Won
1997	The Life	Best Musical	Nominated
2002	Sweet Smell of Success	Best Musical	Nominated
2005	La Cage aux Folles	Best Revival of a Musical	Won
