= To the Struggle Against World Terrorism =

Landmarks in Bayonne, New Jersey

- Interactive map of To the Struggle Against World Terrorism
- Location: Bayonne, New Jersey, United States
- Coordinates: 40°39′49″N 74°04′09″W
- Designer: Zurab Tsereteli
- Height: 100 ft (30 m)
- Beginning date: September 16, 2005
- Dedicated date: September 11, 2006

To the Struggle Against World Terrorism (also known as the Tear of Grief and the Tear Drop Memorial) is a 10–story sculpture by Zurab Tsereteli that was given to the United States as an official gift from the Russian government as a memorial to the victims of the September 11 attacks in 2001, and the 1993 World Trade Center bombing. It stands at the end of the former Military Ocean Terminal in Bayonne, New Jersey. Ceremonial groundbreaking occurred on September 16, 2005, in a ceremony attended by Russian president Vladimir Putin. The monument was dedicated on September 11, 2006, in a ceremony attended by former U.S. president Bill Clinton, coinciding with the 5th anniversary of the 9/11 attacks.

== Design ==
The sculpture comprises a 100-foot (30 m) bronze-clad tower split with a jagged opening in the middle, in which hangs a 40-foot (12 m)-tall nickel-surfaced teardrop. The eleven sides of the monument's base bear granite name plates, on which are etched the names of those who died in the September 11 attacks and the 1993 World Trade Center bombing. However, like some other 9/11 memorials, the dedication was based on an outdated compilation and contains about forty people who were removed from later victim listings.

Tsereteli did not disclose the cost of the sculpture except to say that he paid for labor and materials. A lawyer for the sculptor released the cost at about $12 million. Tsereteli said metals for the sculpture were obtained "From a military factory that did airplanes. In Dzerzhinsk. A secret city."

== Further information ==
A piece of steel from the World Trade Center

The monument was initially given to the local government of Jersey City, but was rejected. It was then relocated to its present placement in Bayonne. In August 2010 the Port Authority of New York and New Jersey announced it had plans to build a container facility on the location and the monument would most likely have to be moved. However, Robert "Captain Bob" Terzi, a Bayonne taxi driver started an online petition to prevent the relocation.

It was listed as one of the world's ugliest statues by Foreign Policy magazine, while The New Yorker said that it looked like "a giant tea biscuit" from a distance. Pro Arts Jersey City called it "an insensitive, self-aggrandizing piece of pompousness by one of the world's blatant self-promoters".

In September 2011, a four-foot (1.2 m) section of steel from the World Trade Center was placed adjacent to the sculpture.

In response to the 2022 Russian invasion of Ukraine, the city of Bayonne had Vladimir Putin's name covered on the two plaques in the park.

== See also ==
- Empty Sky (memorial)
- Hudson Riverfront 9/11 Memorial
- Jersey City 9/11 Memorial
- Memorials and services for the September 11 attacks
