= John Seward Johnson II =

American artist (1930–2020)

- Born: April 16, 1930; New Brunswick, New Jersey, U.S.
- Died: March 10, 2020 (aged 89); Key West, Florida, U.S.
- Occupation: Artist
- Spouses: Barbara Kline (m. 1956; div. 1965) Joyce Horton (m. 1965)
- Children: 3, including John Seward Johnson III
- Parent(s): John Seward Johnson I Ruth Dill
- Website: www.sewardjohnson.com

John Seward Johnson II (April 16, 1930 – March 10, 2020), also known as J. Seward Johnson Jr. and Seward Johnson, was an American artist known for trompe-l'œil painted bronze statues. He was a grandson of Robert Wood Johnson I, the co-founder of Johnson & Johnson, and of Colonel Thomas Melville Dill of Bermuda.

He designed life-size bronze statues that were castings of living people, depicting them engaged in day-to-day activities. A large staff of technicians did the fabrication of the works he designed. Computers and digital technology often were used in the manufacturing process. Sometimes the manufacture was contracted in China. He was the founder of Grounds For Sculpture, a 42-acre (17 ha) sculpture park and museum located in Hamilton Township, Mercer County, New Jersey.

== Early life and education ==
Johnson was born in New Brunswick, New Jersey, on April 16, 1930. His father was John Seward Johnson I, and his mother was Ruth Dill, the sister of actress Diana Dill, making him a first cousin of actor Michael Douglas. Johnson grew up with five siblings: Mary Lea Johnson Richards, Elaine Johnson, Diana Melville Johnson, Jennifer Underwood Johnson, and James Loring "Jimmy" Johnson. His parents divorced around 1937. His father remarried two years later, producing his only brother, Jimmy Johnson, making him an uncle to film director Jamie Johnson.

Johnson attended Forman School for dyslexics. Later, he attended the University of Maine, where he majored in poultry husbandry, but did not graduate. Johnson also served four years in the United States Navy during the Korean War.

== Career ==
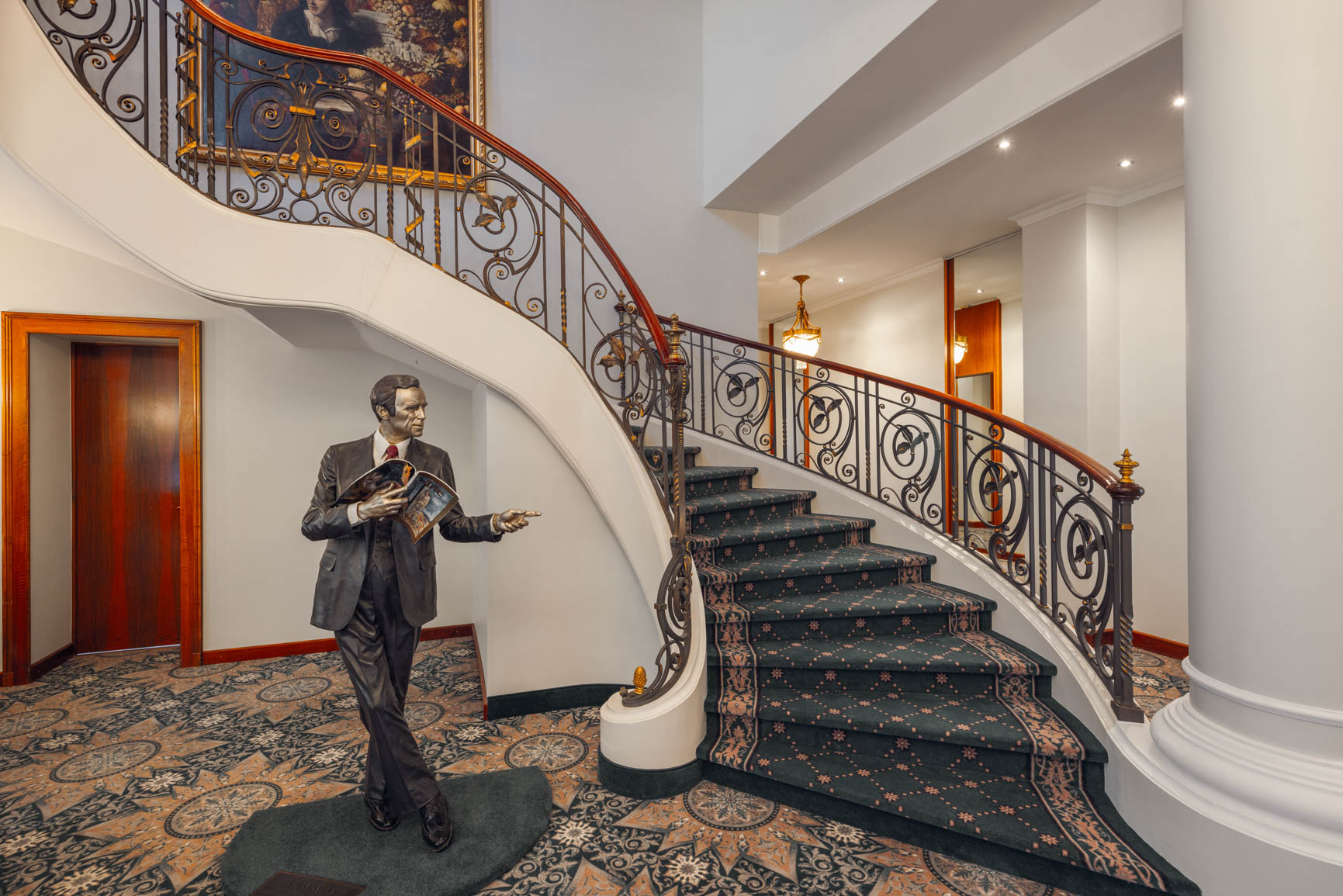
Thataway in the historical lobby of Le Mirador Resort and Spa

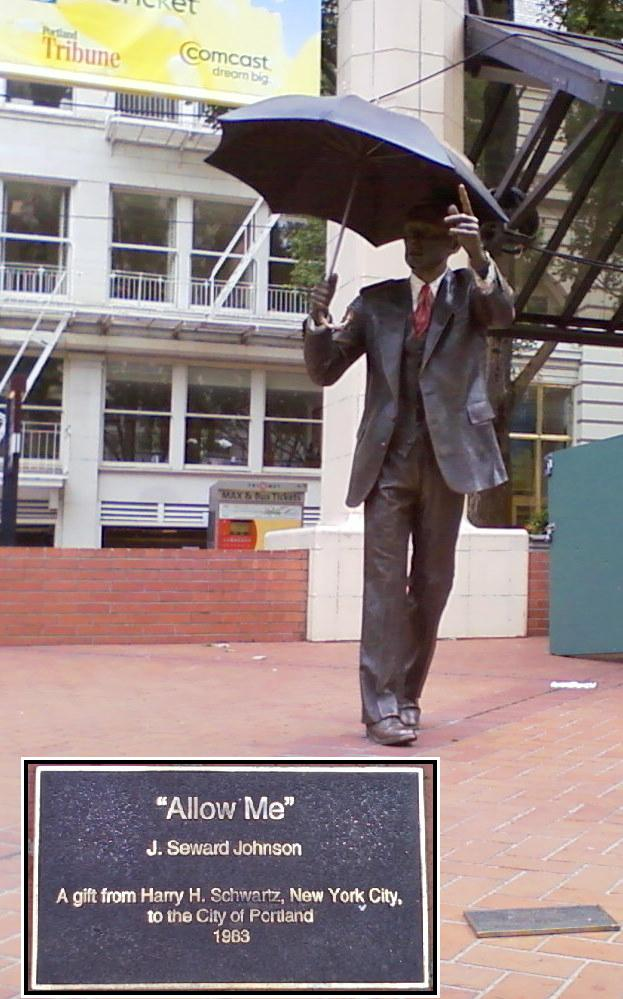
Allow Me in Portland, Oregon

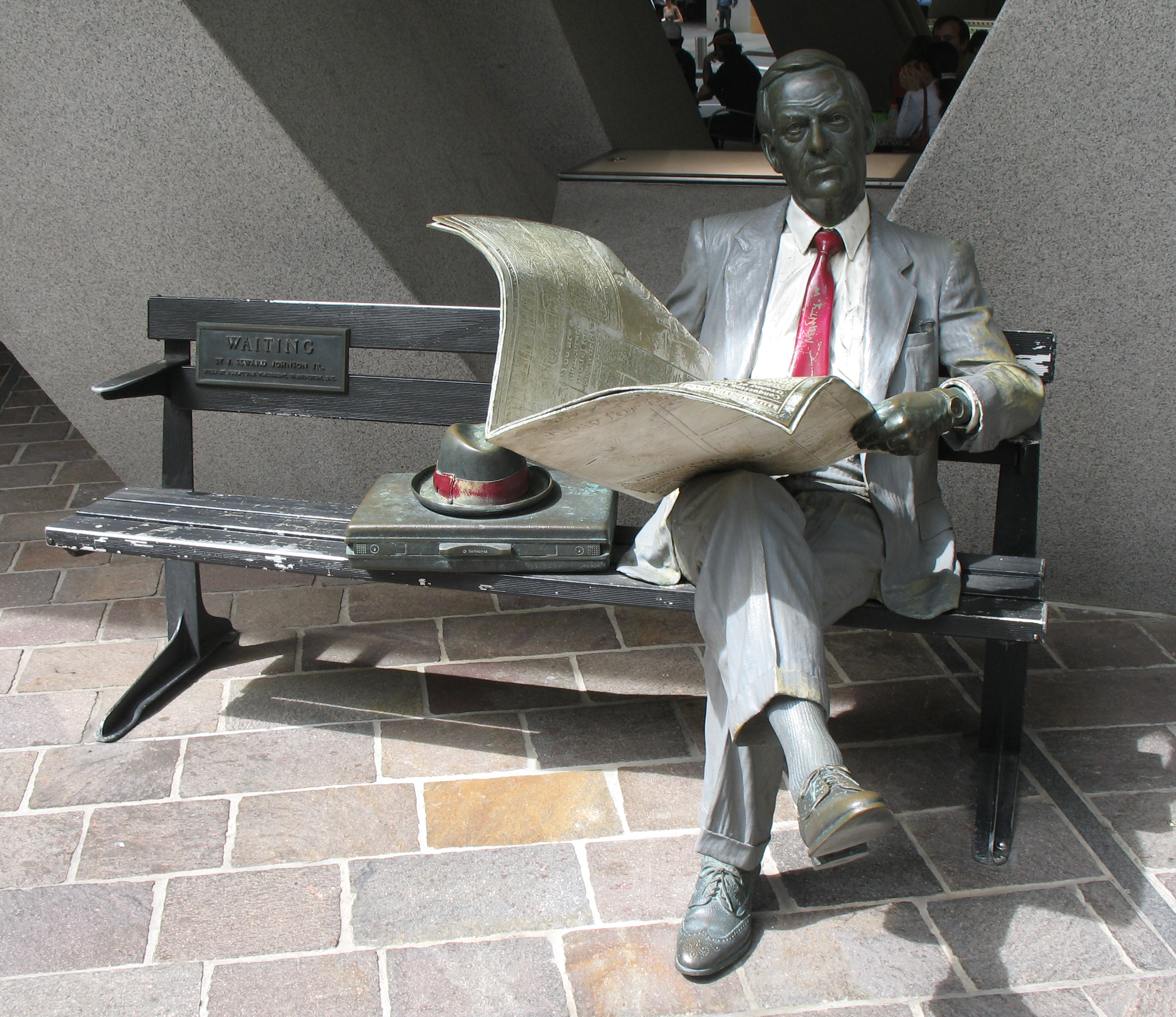
Waiting in Sydney, Australia

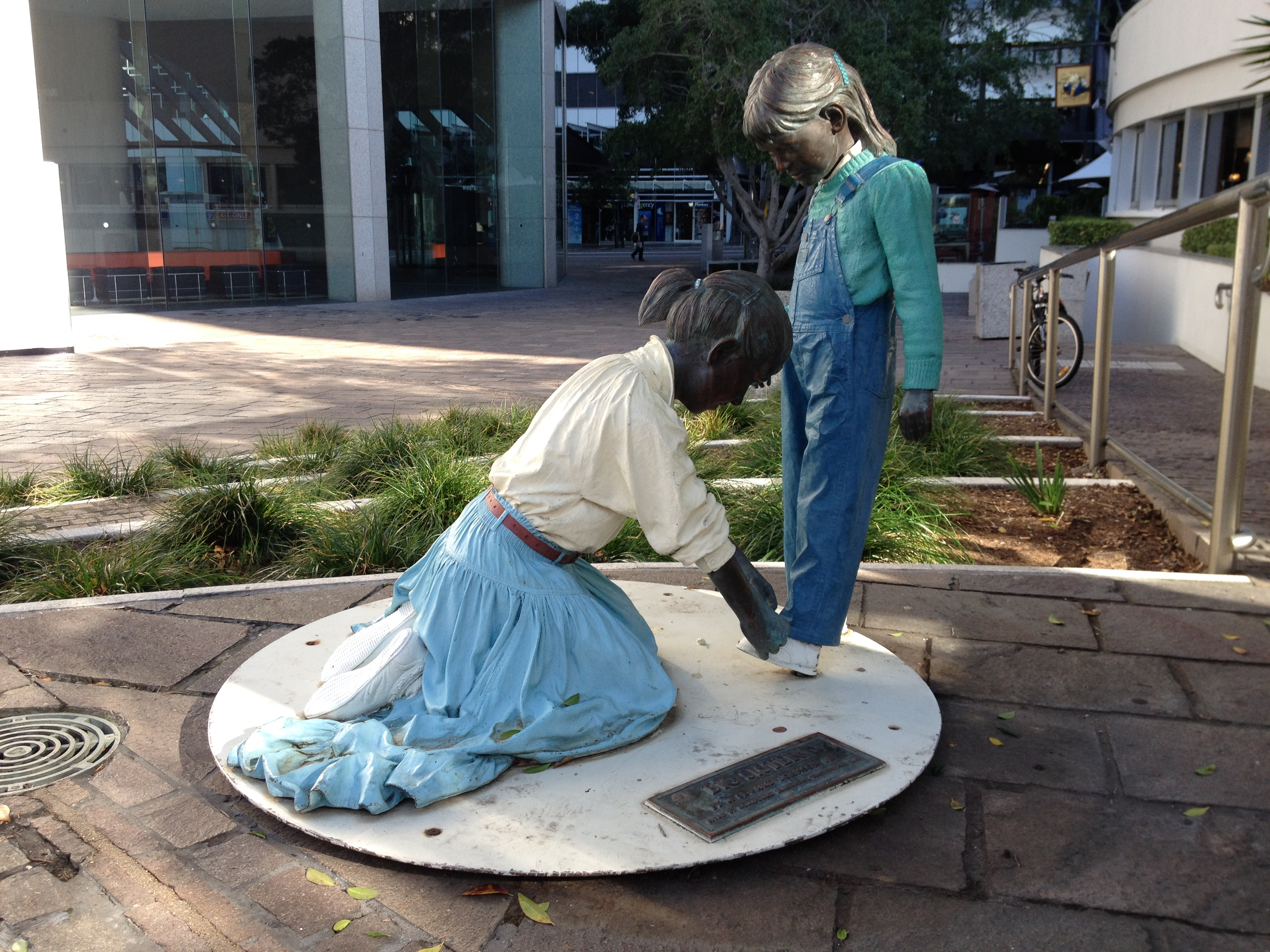
Big Sister in Brisbane, Australia

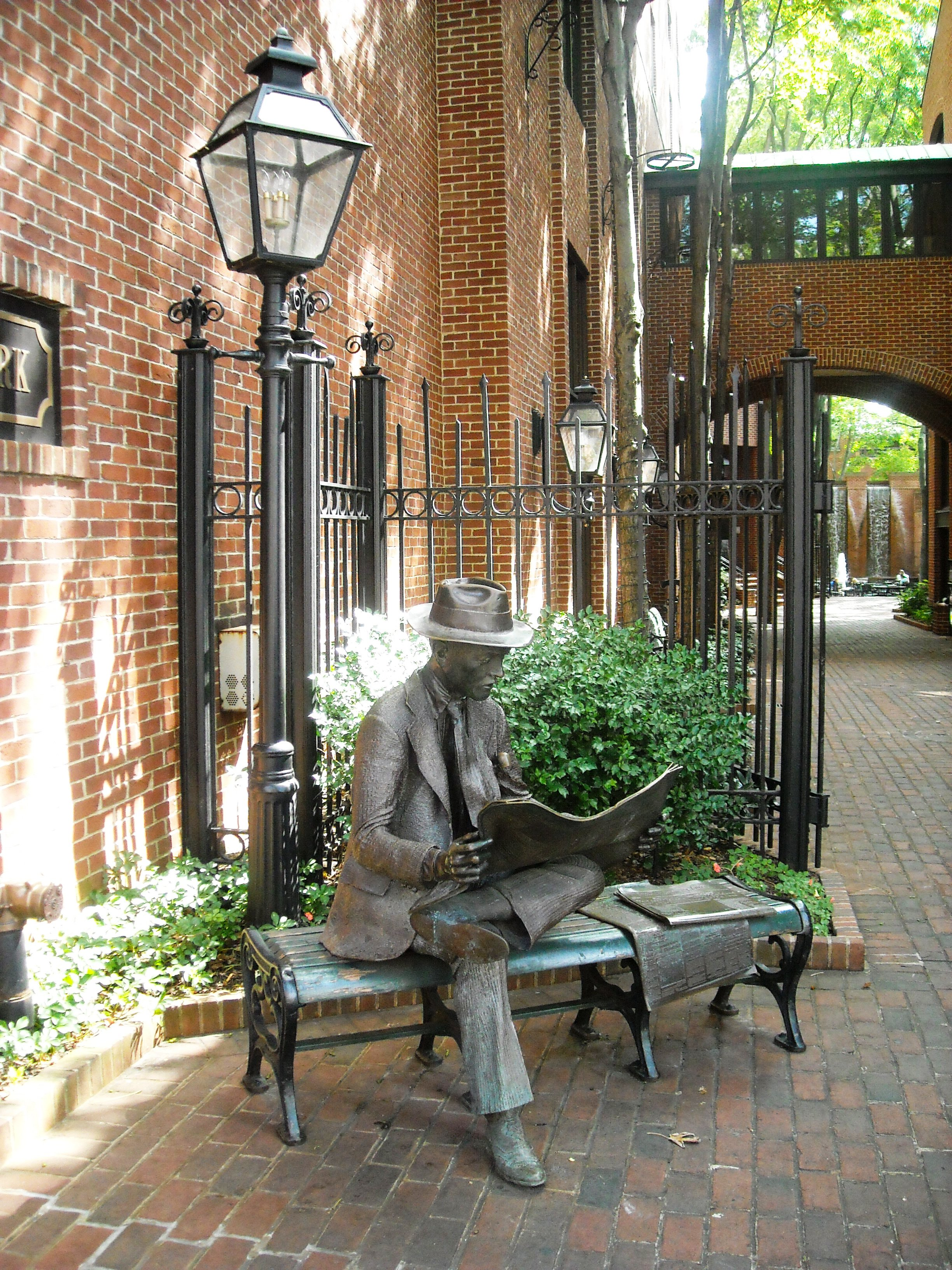
Newspaper Reader in Lancaster, Pennsylvania

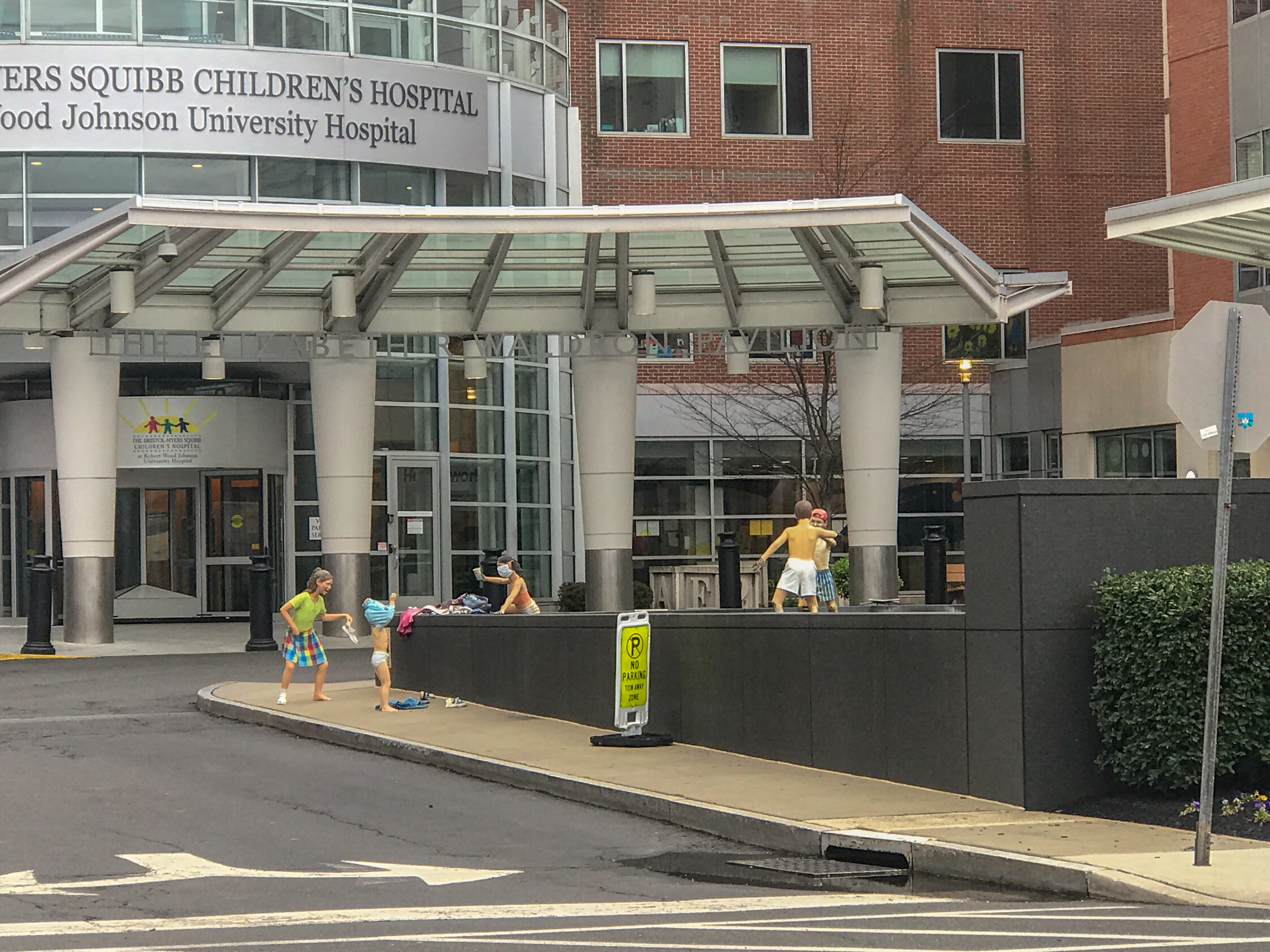
Magic Fountain in New Brunswick, New Jersey

Johnson worked for Johnson & Johnson until 1962, when he was fired by his uncle Robert Wood Johnson II, who had turned the family business into one of the world's largest healthcare corporations.

Johnson maintained a studio in Princeton, New Jersey and later, another at a site in Mercerville, New Jersey that formerly had been used for the New Jersey State Fair.

His early artistic efforts focused on painting, after which he turned to sculpture in 1968. Examples of his statues include:

- Spring (1979), a bronze dedicated in 1979, set in the Crim Dell Woods section of the College of William and Mary, Williamsburg, Virginia. Other examples of Spring castings include the East Brunswick, New Jersey public library and the Fitton Center for Creative Arts in Hamilton, Ohio.
- The Awakening (1980), his largest and most dramatic work, a 70-foot (21 m) five-part statue that depicts a giant trying to free himself from underground. The sculpture was located at Hains Point in Washington, D.C. for nearly twenty-eight years while still owned by Johnson. It was moved to Prince George's County, Maryland in February, 2008, and an attempt was made by the new curator to correct some of the scale distortions of the original installation by altering some implied underground connections and placing the parts in different relationships to each other.
- Double Check (1982), a statue of a businessman checking his attaché case, formerly located in Liberty Plaza Park across an intersection from the World Trade Center, as part of the public space required by a zoning variance granted to the developer of the adjoining skyscraper. Widely published photographs of the debris-battered and dust-covered statue were taken following the September 11 terrorist attacks in 2001. The statue, scars and all, was returned to a prominent corner of the restored and renamed Zuccotti Park in 2006, again open to the public. Periodically, the statue has been adorned by tourists, pranksters, and even Occupy Wall Street protesters. Makeshift Memorial is an adapted 2nd casting of Double Check, placed in 2004 along the Hudson River Waterfront Walkway in Jersey City, New Jersey opposite the original World Trade Center site, and is a component of the Jersey City 9/11 Memorial
- Hitchhiker (1983), a statue at Hofstra University, at the California Avenue gate, near a road leading away from campus.
- Allow Me (1984), a statue of man holding an umbrella, in Pioneer Courthouse Square in Portland, Oregon, part of the Allow Me series.
- Lunch Break (1983), a statue of a worker sitting on a bench, taking a break for lunch with a cigar in hand and lunch box at his side. Statues are known to be placed in Zichron Ya'akov, Israel (originally in Morristown, New Jersey and brought to Israel by the Jerusalem Foundation), in Edmonton, Canada, and Key West, Florida.
- Competition (1984), a statue of Julie Wier, Fairview Heights, Illinois, chosen to represent the spirit of the people of St. Louis as winner of the "picture yourself as a work of art" contest. Dedicated on June 16, 1984 unsigned St. Louis County Library in St. Louis, Missouri.
- Waiting (1988), a statue of a man reading a paper, in Australia Square, Sydney, Australia
- Waiting (1992), a statue of a man reading a paper, in Harrisburg, Pennsylvania
- Déjeuner Déjà Vu (1994), at Grounds for Sculpture in Hamilton Township, Mercer County, New Jersey, a facility founded by Johnson, is a three-dimensional restaging of Édouard Manet's painting, Le déjeuner sur l'herbe
- Copyright Infringement (1994), at Grounds for Sculpture (a facility founded by Johnson) is a sculpture that he named to flaunt his disdain for criticism of his copies of the iconic works of fine art artists with international recognition. It represents the fine artist Édouard Manet, whose work he has copied.
- Unconditional Surrender (a series with several material versions begun in 2005), a spokesperson for Johnson has stated that this series is based on a photograph that is in the public domain, Kissing the War Goodbye, by Victor Jorgensen, however, the Jorgensen photographic image does not extend low enough to include the lower legs and shoes of the subjects, revealed in Alfred Eisenstaedt's famous photograph, V–J day in Times Square, that are represented identically in the statue. A spokesperson for Life has called it a copyright infringement of the latter image. Nonetheless, the first version, a bronze statue in life-size, was placed on temporary exhibition during the 2005 anniversary of V-J Day at the Times Square Information Center near where the original photographs were taken in Manhattan.

Several slightly differing twenty-five-feet-tall-versions have been constructed in styrofoam and aluminum with little detail, painted, and put on display by Johnson in San Diego, California, Key West, Florida, Snug Harbor in New York, and Sarasota, Florida. Their immensity has drawn crowds of viewers at each site although the view of them from nearby is severely limited, essentially allowing a vista of the legs and up the skirt. The statues have been described as kitsch by one critic. Johnson later would dub the statue "Embracing Peace", which he treated as a double entendre when spoken.

A proposal to establish a permanent location for a copy on the Sarasota bay front generated a heated controversy about the suitability of the statue to the location, suitability as a military service memorial, the permanent placement of any statue on that public property, as well as the particular issues of lack of originality, mechanical construction, copyright infringement, and the kitsch allegations about the statue. In final agreement documents with the purchaser (a private person), Johnson committed the purchase price to cover copyright liability damages in order to have the statue placed. The city was wary of accepting a gift from the purchaser that might result in a financial loss from a possible legal battle that evidenced merit, according to the city attorney.

In October 2014, French feminist group Osez La Feminisme ! petitioned to have a copy of the statue, erected at a World War II memorial in Normandy in September 2014, removed and sent back to the United States, criticizing it as "immortali[zing] a sexual assault"
Controversies surrounding the statue still existed in Sarasota at the close of 2021, when the question of whether to place a sign addressing them was presented to the city commission at a public meeting in Sarasota on December 6.

- Big Sister, just outside the Pig 'N' Whistle pub and Michael's Restaurant at 123 Eagle Street, part of the Celebrating the Familiar series
- Morris Frank and Buddy (2005) - a statue of the co-founder of The Seeing Eye and the first guide dog for the blind trained in the US stands in the Morristown Green in New Jersey. Frank is shown giving the "forward" command to his dog.
- First Ride (2006), a statue of a father helping his young daughter learn to ride a bike, in Carmel, Indiana.
- Newspaper Reader (1981), at the entrance to Steinman Park, Lancaster, Pennsylvania. The gentleman is looking at three Newspapers - The Lancaster New Era reporting the Apollo 11 Moon landing (July 21, 1969), The Intelligencer Journal reporting Three Mile Island nuclear accident (March 29, 1979) and the paper he is holding, the September 16, 1923 edition, reporting that the Steinman brothers challenged the no-work-on-Sunday blue laws by publishing the Sunday News for the first time.
- Forever Marilyn (2011), a 26-foot (7.9 m), 17-ton representation of Marilyn Monroe standing over a gusty subway grate in her appearance in The Seven Year Itch. Until 2012, the statue was located at Pioneer Court in Chicago, where it attracted many visitors and some controversy for its risque features. It was moved to downtown Palm Springs, California in 2012. In July 2013 plans were announced that it would be moved to New Jersey for a 2014 exhibit honoring Johnson at the Grounds For Sculpture. The statue returned to Palm Springs in 2019 and is now displayed in a central location.

Magic Fountain stands outside The Bristol-Myers Squibb Children's Hospital in New Brunswick, New Jersey. The fountain features metallic children playing in the fountain and splashing around.

For statues made in a series named, Iconic, by Johnson, many of which are very large, a computer program is employed that translates two-dimensional images into statues that are constructed by a machine driven by the program. Often, these subjects are images that already are well known as the works of others, generating heated ethical controversies regarding copyright infringement and derivative works due to substantial similarity issues.

Johnson's works were selected by the United States Information Agency to represent the freedoms of the United States in a public and private partnership enterprise representation sponsored by General Motors and many other US corporations at the World EXPO celebration in Seville, Spain during 1992.

=== Criticism ===
Johnson's work was labeled as "kitsch" in a 1984 article by an art professor and critic at Princeton University, who explained its rejection as he was commenting on a controversy raging about the work in New Haven, Connecticut.

His 2003 show at the Corcoran Gallery of Art, Beyond the Frame: Impressionism Revisited, which presented his statues imitating famous Impressionist paintings, was a success with audiences, but was panned nationally by acknowledged art critics such as Blake Gopnik writing for The Washington Post and drew strong criticism from curators at other museums about a prominent museum of fine art presenting an exhibit of his work.

== Philanthropy ==
Johnson was the chairman and CEO of The Atlantic Foundation, the foundation created by his father, John Seward Johnson I, in 1963. Johnson created the Johnson Atelier Technical Institute of Sculpture, an educational, nonprofit casting and fabrication facility in 1974 as a means of fostering young sculptors' talents, while creating a foundry designed to construct his statues that is so well-equipped and staffed that it is chosen by many renowned sculptors. Educational programs at the Atelier ceased in 2004. The Johnson Atelier now operates as a division of The Sculpture Foundation. Johnson continued to make his sculpture at the facility but casting often was performed off premises, with some of his larger works being cast in the People's Republic of China.

He also founded an organization named "The Sculpture Foundation", to promote his works. In 1987, he published Celebrating the Familiar: The Sculpture of J. Seward Johnson, Jr.

Under Johnson's direction, The Atlantic Foundation purchased the old New Jersey Fairgrounds in Hamilton, New Jersey and in 1992 founded the Grounds For Sculpture to display work completed at the Johnson Atelier and other outdoor exhibitions. In 2000 park operations were transferred to a new public charity with the same intent that continues to operate the park.

He was president of the International Sculpture Center of Hamilton, New Jersey, which publishes a magazine out of offices in Washington, D.C.

Johnson also was the president of a large oceanographic research institution in Florida that had been founded by his father. The institution published a science magazine.

Johnson and his wife funded the construction of The Joyce and Seward Johnson Theater for the Theater for the New City, an Off-Broadway theater in New York City.

== Personal life ==
Johnson was excluded from his father's will, which left the bulk of his fortune to Barbara Piasecka Johnson, his father's wife and former art curator. He and his siblings sued on grounds that their father was not mentally competent at the time he signed the will. It was settled out of court, and the children were granted about 12% of the fortune.

Johnson was formerly married to Barbara Kline. She often engaged in extramarital affairs in their home, driving Johnson to attempt suicide. In 1965, he acknowledged paternity to Jenia Anne "Cookie" Johnson to speed up the divorce process. Years later, Johnson's family had a legal battle regarding Cookie Johnson's eligibility for a share in the Johnson & Johnson fortune. The court ruled in favor of Cookie.

Johnson later married Joyce Horton, a novelist. They had two children, John Seward Johnson III and actress Cecelia Constance Johnson, who is credited as "India Blake."

Johnson died from cancer at his home in Key West, Florida on March 10, 2020, at the age of 89.

== See also ==
- The Newspaper Reader (1978), Forest Grove, Oregon, U.S.
- Rogers v. Koons
