= The Newspaper Reader =

Sculpture in Oregon, United States

- Artist: John Seward Johnson II
- Year: 1978
- Location: Forest Grove, Oregon, U.S.

The Newspaper Reader is an outdoor 1978 sculpture by John Seward Johnson II, installed along Pacific Avenue in Forest Grove, Oregon, United States. The bronze sculpture depicts a man sitting on a bench and reading a newspaper. It measures approximately 4.5 x 2.5 x 2.5 ft, and rests on a concrete base which measures approximately 2.5 x 5.5 x 1.5 ft. The artwork was surveyed by the Smithsonian Institution's "Save Outdoor Sculpture!" program in 1994.

== See also ==
- 1978 in art
