= Double Check =

Sculpture by John Seward Johnson in Manhattan, New York, U.S.

- The sculpture in 2016
- Artist: John Seward Johnson II
- Year: 1982
- Type: Sculpture
- Location: New York City, New York, United States; 40.7093°N 74.0105°W

Double Check is a 1982 sculpture by John Seward Johnson II, located across from Zuccotti Park at the corner of Liberty Street and Broadway in Manhattan, New York City. The bronze sculpture portrays a well-dressed businessman sitting with his briefcase open, which is filled with office materials getting ready to enter an office building. The statue is notable for its association with the 9/11 attacks.

== History ==
The sculpture was installed before the September 11 attacks serving as an art piece. However, after the attack, it became a memorial site, with people leaving flowers, notes, and candles. Photos were taken where the sculpture was covered in ash after the attack with it suffering minor damage. It was moved multiple times and was moved for the final time across from Zuccotti Park (then Liberty Park). The statue was removed to be cleaned and was returned to its original place on June 1, 2006. (Note: The source does not say when the sculpture was removed, but it does says that it returned in June 1, 2006.)

Makeshift Memorial an adapted second casting of Double Check, placed in 2004 along the Hudson River Waterfront Walkway in Jersey City, New Jersey opposite the original World Trade Center site, and is a component of the Jersey City 9/11 Memorial.

== See also ==
- Artwork damaged or destroyed in the September 11 attacks
- 1982 in art
