= John Seward Johnson III =

American filmmaker, philanthropist and entrepreneur

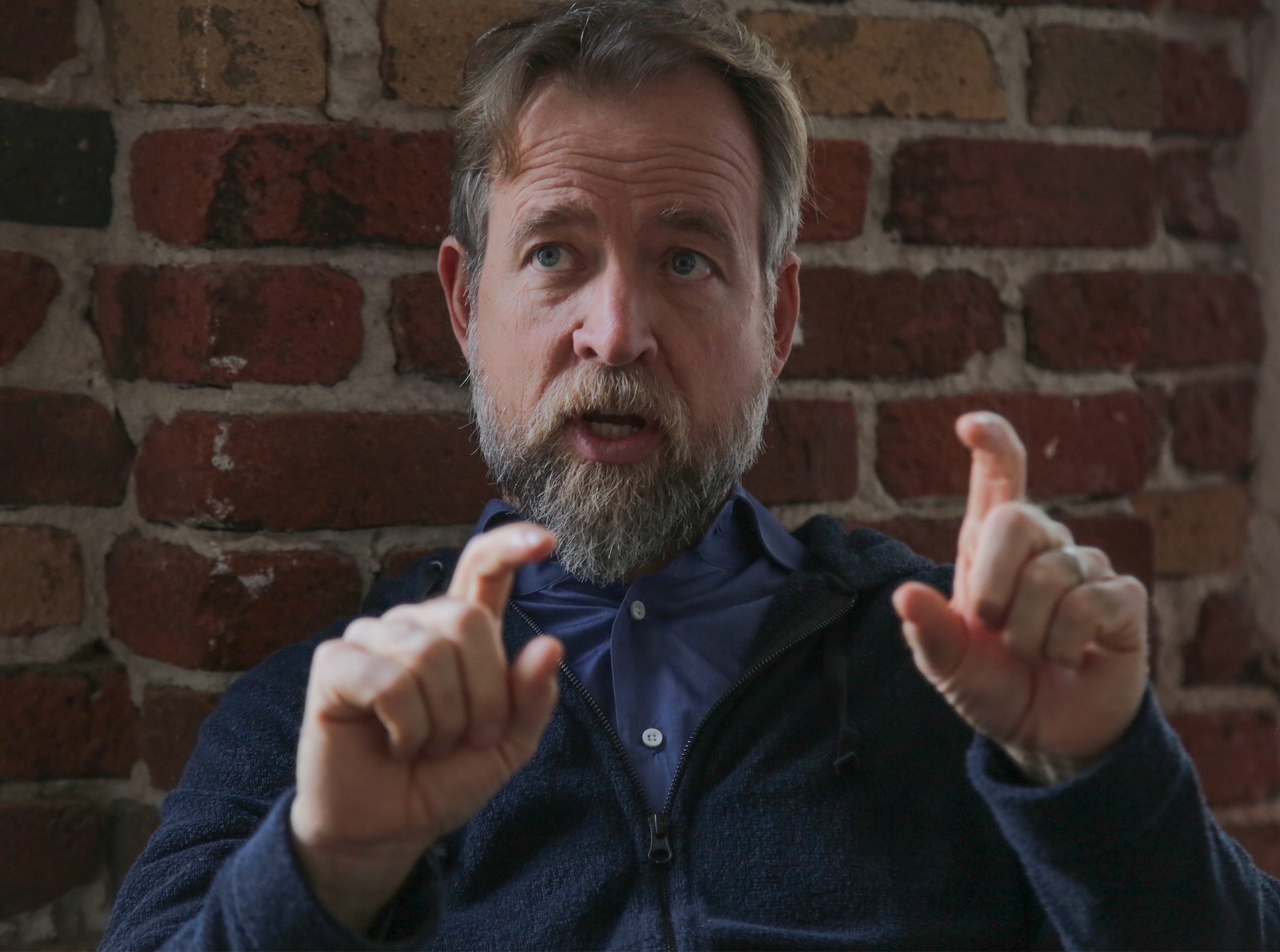
- Johnson discusses Harmony Labs, 2017
- Born: September 2, 1966 (age 60); Boston, Massachusetts
- Education: St. John's College (BA); Columbia University (MA)
- Occupations: Entrepreneur, filmmaker, philanthropist
- Years active: 1997–present
- Known for: BuzzFeed, Eyebeam, Screenwriters' Colony
- Spouse: Susan Kingman
- Children: 3
- Parent(s): John Seward Johnson II; Cecilia Joyce Horton

John Seward Johnson III (born September 2, 1966) is an American filmmaker, philanthropist and entrepreneur. He is a great-grandson of Robert Wood Johnson I (co-founder of Johnson & Johnson) and the son of artist John Seward Johnson II.

He is the co-founder of BuzzFeed and founder and chairman of Harmony Hotel, and founder of Eyebeam, Screenwriters Colony and the Filmmakers Collaborative. He is also a member of the Henry Crown Fellowship at the Aspen Institute.

== Early life and education ==
Johnson was born in Boston, Massachusetts. His father, John Seward Johnson II, was an artist known for his life-size bronze statues made of castings of living people depicting them in quotidian situations. His mother, Cecilia Joyce Horton, is a theater producer and novelist. He has a younger sister, Clelia Constance Johnson, an actress known publicly by her stage name, India Blake. Johnson is a first cousin of documentary filmmaker Jamie Johnson. He attended St. John's College in Annapolis, Maryland, where he earned a bachelor's degree in philosophy and mathematics, and then earned a master's degree from Columbia University.

== Career ==
=== Eyebeam ===
Johnson founded art and technology center Eyebeam in 1997. In 2003, Johnson hired Jonah Peretti as Director of Research and Development with the purpose of establishing the web as a place for art experiments. They went on to produce the first online series of public experiments in viral media in the "Contagious Media Showdown". Eyebeam also produced the first geocoding of public campaign finance data, later served up as the site Fundrace and hosted by the Huffington Post.

=== BuzzFeed ===
In 2006, Johnson co-founded the website BuzzFeed with entrepreneur Jonah Peretti. BuzzFeed is an online media company that detects and accelerates traction of trending news and entertainment. It was initially conceived of as a media analytics company to track viral content.

=== Harmony Labs ===
In 2008, Johnson founded Harmony Institute, an applied research lab exploring how media and society interact and to experiment with using media to support an open, inclusive, democratic society. It has produced peer-reviewed publications, white papers, interactive tools, and contributed to many prominent social impact media projects and campaigns, in partnership with private foundations, advocacy organizations and media publishers.

In 2017, Harmony Institute became Harmony Labs with a renewed focus on understanding how influence operates within media systems and to experiment with media approaches that optimize for positive social effects. Harmony Labs also runs an accelerator that supports early-stage startups that are building media tech and developing data-driven approaches and tools for understanding and leveraging media influence.

During his time at Harmony, Johnson has co-authored a number of research publications, including Audience preferences are predicted by temporal reliability of neural processing published in Nature Communications, Measuring Impact: The Importance of Evaluation for Documentary Film Campaigns published in M/C Journal, Trailer brain: Neural and behavioral analysis of social issue documentary viewing with low-density EEG published in The International Workshop on Computational Models of Narrative (CMN’16), and “No Fracking Way!” Documentary Film, Discursive Opportunity, and Local Opposition against Hydraulic Fracturing in the United States, 2010 to 2013 published in the American Sociological Review.

=== Nosara, Costa Rica Hotels ===
In 2004, Johnson and his wife Susan Short, purchased and renovated an old hotel in the Pacific surfing village of Nosara, Costa Rica in an effort to save it from being purchased and developed into a major international commercial-chain facility. The Harmony Hotel is a boutique health and wellness-oriented hotel. They are the hotel's current owners, and have since purchased two other hotels in Nosara, the Sunset Shack and the Harbor Reef Hotel.

=== La Voz de Guanacaste ===
In 2006, Johnson purchased a local weekly paper in Nosara, La Voz de Guanacaste, and in 2015 turned it into Costa Rica's first non profit investigative newspaper.

== Creative ventures ==
Johnson wrote, produced, and directed two feature films: Without a Trace: June 10, 1979 (1991) and Ratchet (1996)

In 2002, Johnson established the Screenwriters Colony, a residency-inspired incubator for emerging screenwriters based in Nantucket, Massachusetts. The Screenwriters Colony works in partnership with the Nantucket Film Festival.

== Philanthropy ==
Johnson serves and has served in various capacities at arts and science organizations including the board of the Dreamland Theater, RepresentUs, Screenwriters Colony, Almanack Arts Colony, and Harmony Labs. He was also a founding board member of the Nantucket Film Festival.

Johnson is also a Trustee of the Atlantic Foundation, which provides grants to such organizations as Eyebeam, Brooklyn Waldorf School, Mary McDowell, Grounds for Sculpture, and Amigos of Costa Rica.

== Awards and honors ==
In 2003, Johnson was announced as a Henry Crown Fellow for the Aspen Institute, a nonprofit organization that “promotes the pursuit of common ground and deeper understanding in a nonpartisan and non-ideological setting”. He was a member of the Discover Class of 2003.

== Personal life ==
Johnson is married to Susan Short, an artist, documentarian and naturalist. They reside in Brooklyn, New York with their three children.
