= Le Mirador Resort & Spa =

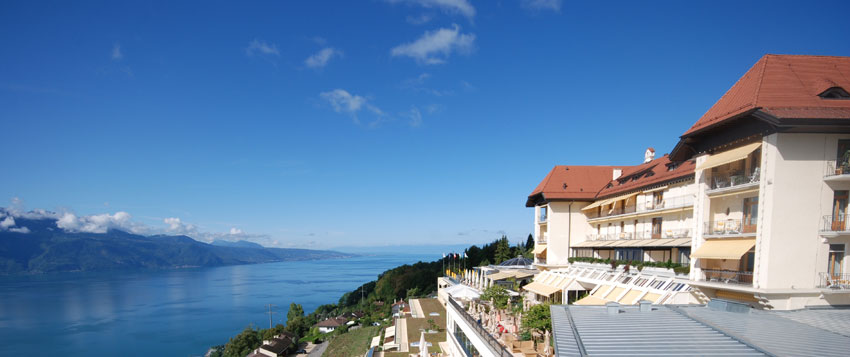
Building with view of Lake Geneva, 2014

Le Mirador Resort & Spa, previously Le Mirador Kempinski, is a former nursing home which was built in 1904. It is located in Chardonne, Vaud at Le Mont-Pèlerin in Switzerland.

The building was originally a purpose built nursing home called Mon Repos which was built in 1904 by the Société de l'Ermitage. The architect was J.-H. Collombet who endeavoured to avoid the coldness of the architecture of many contemporary clinics.

In 1934 the French composer, Maurice Ravel stayed at the nursing home following an accidental injury.
