= John Seward Johnson I =

American businessman (1895–1983)

- Born: John Seward Johnson; July 14, 1895; New Brunswick, New Jersey, U.S.
- Died: May 23, 1983 (aged 87); Fort Pierce, Florida, U.S.
- Spouses: Ruth R. N. Dill (m. 19??–1937); Esther Underwood (1939–1971) Barbara Piasecka (m. 1971)
- Children: Mary Lea Johnson Richards; John Seward Johnson II; Diana Melville Johnson; Elaine Johnson Wold; Jennifer Johnson Duke; James Loring Johnson
- Parent(s): Robert Wood Johnson I Evangeline Brewster Armstrong

John Seward Johnson I (July 14, 1895 – May 23, 1983) was one of the sons of Robert Wood Johnson I (co-founder of Johnson & Johnson). He was also known as J. Seward Johnson Sr. and Seward Johnson. He was a longtime executive and director of Johnson & Johnson. He founded the Harbor Branch Oceanographic Institution (HBOI), and was the grandfather of Jamie Johnson, who directed the documentary Born Rich.

== Early life ==
He was born on July 14, 1895, in New Brunswick, New Jersey, to Robert Wood Johnson I and Evangeline Brewster Armstrong. He had three siblings: Roberta Johnson, Robert Wood Johnson II, and Evangeline Johnson.

== Personal life ==
Johnson's first marriage was to Ruth Dill, the sister of actress Diana Dill. They had four children: Mary Lea Johnson Richards, Elaine Johnson, John Seward Johnson II, and Diana Melville Johnson Firestone. It was alleged that Johnson would later sexually abuse his eldest daughter from age nine to fifteen.

In 1939, Johnson married Esther Underwood. They had two children: Jennifer Underwood Johnson and James Loring Johnson.

During his thirty-two year marriage, he engaged in extramarital affairs with his chambermaid Barbara Piasecka. In 1971, they married with none of Johnson's children in attendance. Piasecka Johnson "often physically and emotionally abused her husband", trial adversaries said. He signed his final will on April 14, 1983, leaving the bulk of his fortune to her. In that year, Johnson died of cancer at the age of 87. In accordance with the terms of the will, she received $402,824,971.59.

The exclusion of the rest of his family from the will led to at least three highly publicized legal battles. In the Johnson v. Johnson court case, his six children from his first two marriages sued on grounds that he wasn't mentally competent at the time he signed the will. It was settled out of court, and the children were granted about 12% of the fortune. The second legal dispute was regarding the eligibility of Mary Lea Johnson Richards' husband's share of the fortune, which lasted twelve years. The court ruled in favor of her husband. The third battle was regarding the eligibility of John Seward Johnson II's daughter's share of the fortune. The court ruled in favor of his daughter.

== See also ==
- Johnson v. Johnson (1988, ISBN 0-440-20041-5)
- Undue Influence: The Epic Battle for the Johnson & Johnson Fortune (1993, ISBN 0-688-06425-6)
