= Barbara Piasecka Johnson =

Polish humanitarian, philanthropist, art connoisseur and collector

- Born: Barbara Piasecka; February 25, 1937; Staniewicze, Poland (now Belarus)
- Died: April 1, 2013 (aged 76); Sobótka, Wrocław, Poland
- Citizenship: Polish, American
- Occupations: Philanthropist, art collector
- Spouse: John Seward Johnson I

Barbara "Basia" Piasecka Johnson (born Barbara Piasecka; February 25, 1937 – April 1, 2013) was a Polish humanitarian, philanthropist, art connoisseur and collector.

== Early life ==
Piasecka Johnson was born in Staniewicze near Grodno, Poland (now in Belarus). Her father was a farmer. She graduated from Wroclaw University with a M.A. in Art History. She left Poland in 1968, with $100 in her possession.

== Career ==
Piasecka was hired as a cook by Esther Underwood Johnson, then wife of John Seward Johnson I. She then worked as the Johnsons' chambermaid.

One time seeing his admiration for one of the paintings he had bought, she said casually that he overpaid for it because it is not a picture of a master, but his disciple and by using the dates proved it. Johnson was shocked about her knowledge and expertise, and appointed her as consultant to his purchases of works of art. A year after she became Johnson's chambermaid, she became his curator for the Seward Johnson's art collection.

== Personal life ==
During this time John Seward Johnson engaged in extramarital affairs with Piasecka Johnson. In 1971, he had divorced his second wife, Esther "Essie" Underwood Johnson, (who had hired Piasecka), and they married. He was 76 and she was 34. None of Johnson's children were invited to the wedding. Trial witnesses brought to court by J. S. Johnson's children during the proceedings concerning his will asserted that Piasecka Johnson "often physically and emotionally abused her husband". Piasecka Johnson said she was a devoted wife for 12 years of marriage.

She was the primary beneficiary of his will and received the bulk of her husband's fortune of $400 million after he died in 1983 ($1.29 billion as of 2025). Excluded from their father's will, Seward Johnson's six children sued on grounds that their father was not mentally competent at the time he signed the will. The case went to trial but was settled prior to return of a verdict, and the children were granted about 12% of the fortune, leaving Piasecka Johnson in control of the majority of the estate.

In 2007, Johnson was listed on the Forbes 400 World's Richest People list with an estimated net worth of $2.7 billion, making her the 149th richest person. She converted the family estate in Princeton, New Jersey, named Jasna Polana, into a golf course that is part of the PGA Tour-owned Tournament Players Club franchise.

Johnson was involved in a number of charitable projects, especially in Poland, through the Barbara Piasecka Johnson Foundation which she established in 1974. Johnson founded a school in Gdańsk for autistic children, and donated to the church in Poland, and welfare centres.

Johnson had homes in Italy and Poland, and lived the last years of her life in Monaco. Johnson died in her native Poland in Sobótka, and was buried in Wrocław.

Paintings from Piasecka Johnson's art collection were displayed in Monaco's Museum of the Chapel of Visitation from 1995 to 2014. Her collection was removed from the chapel in May 2014 in preparation for its eventual sale at Christie's auction house in July 2014.

== See also ==
- Johnson v. Johnson (1988, ISBN 0-440-20041-5)
- Undue Influence: The Epic Battle for the Johnson & Johnson Fortune (1993, ISBN 0-688-06425-6)
