= Maritime response following the September 11 attacks =

Boats evacuated victims, pumped water to firefighters

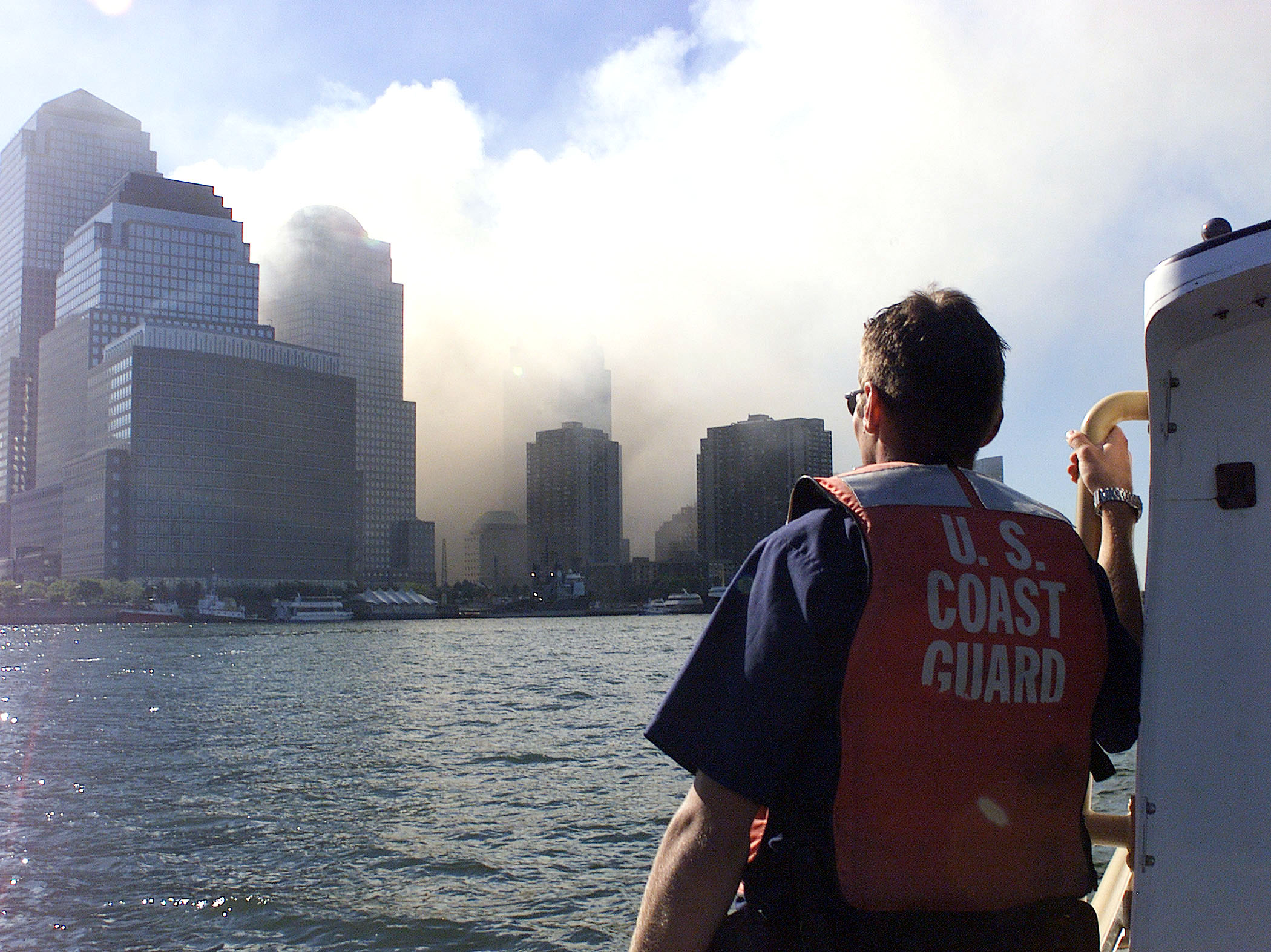
- United States Coast Guard patrolling the New York Harbor with the impact area of World Trade Center in sight, September 11, 2001.
- Date: September 11, 2001
- Location: New York Harbor; 40°40′06″N 74°02′44″W
- Also known as: 9/11 Boatlift
- Type: Emergency evacuation Search and rescue Firefighting
- Cause: September 11 attacks
- Organized by: United States Coast Guard
- Participants: U.S. Coast Guard, FDNY, Sandy Hook pilots, NY Waterway, Circle Line Sightseeing Cruises, Staten Island Ferry, SeaStreak, and other public and private vessels
- Outcome: More than 500,000 people rescued and evacuated from Lower Manhattan

Following the September 11 attacks in New York City, many people were unable to leave Lower Manhattan due to the closure of bridges and tunnels and mass transportation. Within minutes of the first plane hitting the first tower, multiple fireboats from the New York City Fire Department rushed to the scene. The United States Coast Guard coordinated a large convoy of merchant ships, tugboats, and ferries to evacuate the stranded and injured victims.

More than 150 different vessels and 600 sailors helped evacuate victims and delivered supplies in the days following the attacks. According to commandant of the Coast Guard James Loy, the mass evacuation of more than 500,000 civilians following the attacks "moved more people from the island than the 1940 evacuation of Allied troops from Dunkirk in France." It remains one of the largest maritime evacuations in recorded history.

== Background ==
Following the second plane crash into the South Tower, the Port Authority of New York and New Jersey closed all of the bridges and tunnels under their jurisdiction. The MTA Bridges and Tunnels also closed their crossings into Manhattan for at least a day after the attacks. As a result, many people were either stranded in Lower Manhattan or tried to evacuate via East Rivers crossings, like the Brooklyn Bridge.

The United States Coast Guard New York Sector closed the New York Harbor to all ship movements. After the collapse of the South Tower, many evacuees began to arrive at the Lower Hudson River piers to try and evacuate.

== Maritime evacuation ==
In early reporting of the evacuation, large numbers of between 500,000 and 1 million people were evacuated by boat with a believed closer number of about 270,000 people actually evacuated. There were about 130 to 150 boats used in the response, ranging from Staten Island ferries that could hold about 6,000 people to rubber dinghies that could carry about two or three passengers at a time.

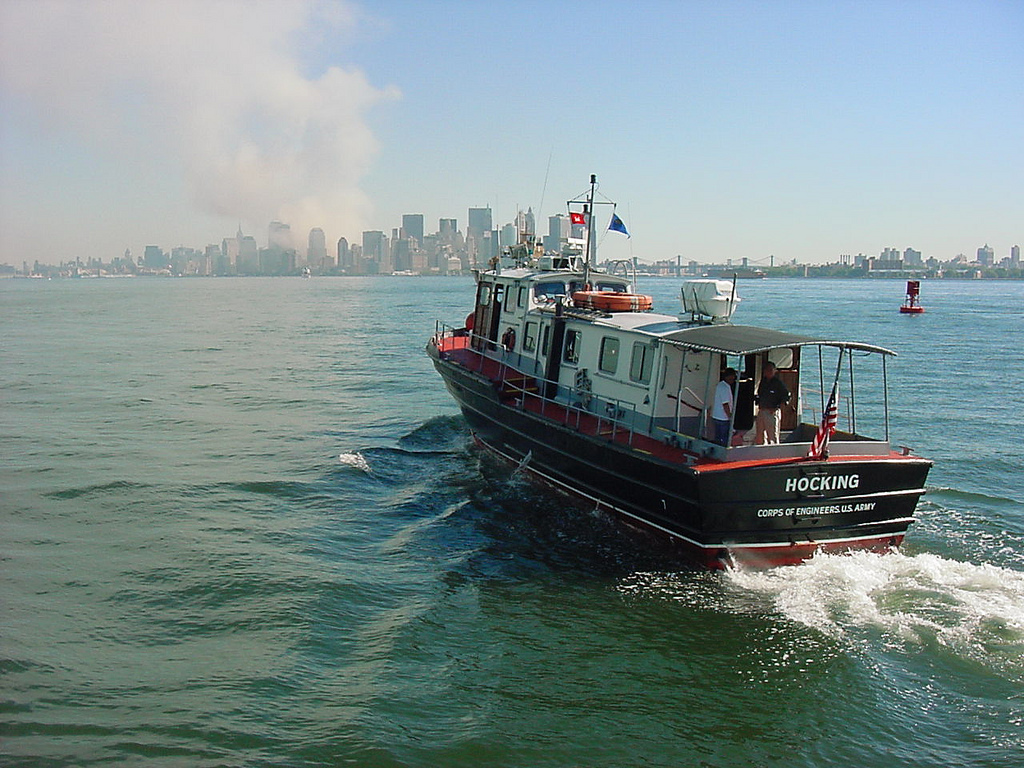
Patrol Boat Hocking of the U.S. Army Corps of Engineers en route to the site of the World Trade Center.

=== Coast Guard and government response ===
The United States Coast Guard Vessel Traffic Service and the Harbor Unit of the New York Police Department put out emergency radio calls to all nearby vessels to help evacuate from Battery Park. In addition to vessel coordination, the Coast Guard assisted at the Fresh Kills Landfill and Lower Manhattan with human remains and property recovery operations. U.S. Coast Guard ships that responded included cutters USCGC Katherine Walker, USCGC Adak, and USCGC Tahoma.

The Coast Guard tug USCGC Hawser, homeported in Bayonne, New Jersey, was the first on scene in New York Harbor and acted as On-Scene Commander. Adak arrived on scene an hour later and took over On-Scene Commander responsibilities. For hours Adak coordinated the evacuation of civilians, transport of firefighters and rescue personnel, and the establishment of security zones to protect other high valued assets from further attack. For her part in the response to the attacks of September 11, Adak received the Secretary of Transportation Outstanding Unit Award.

Multiple fireboats of the New York City Fire Department, including Fire Fighter and the John J. Harvey (the latter of which had been retired since 1995), were among the first boats on the scene and provided firefighting activities from the water, pumping harbour water at high pressure to the hoses of land-based firefighters when other water was in low supply or simply unavailable due to breaks in the waterlines caused by the destruction of the towers.

=== Civilian response ===
Multiple ferry lines, including the Staten Island Ferry and SeaStreak, helped in the evacuation. A variety of vessels including tugboats and merchant ships in the New York metropolitan area responded to the emergency calls for evacuations. NY Waterway, with a fleet of 24 boats, moved nearly 150,000 people.

=== Notable captains and crew ===
During the evacuation in the aftermath of the September 11 attacks, hundreds of maritimers responded to the Coast Guard's call. Many of these sailors' names are lost to history, but those featured in the documentary include:

- Vincent Ardolino
- Rick Thornton
- Kirk Slater
- Andrew McGovern
- James Parese
- Robin Jones
- Michael Day
- Paul Frank
- Marcus Carter

== Aftermath ==
Multiple news outlets praised the maritime coordination and evacuation.

Norman Mineta, the Secretary of Transportation in a 9/11 Commission hearing, said the response was the "largest maritime evacuation conducted in the history of the United States". As part of the 20th anniversary commemoration, the New York Council Navy League of the United States honored the maritime operators for their heroism in "the Great Boatlift of 9/11".

== Depiction in media ==
In 2011, a documentary called Boatlift: An Untold Tale of 9/11 Resilience was released detailing the stories of boat crews responding to the evacuations. It was narrated by Tom Hanks.
