= Woody Johnson =

American businessman, diplomat, and sports team owner (born 1947)

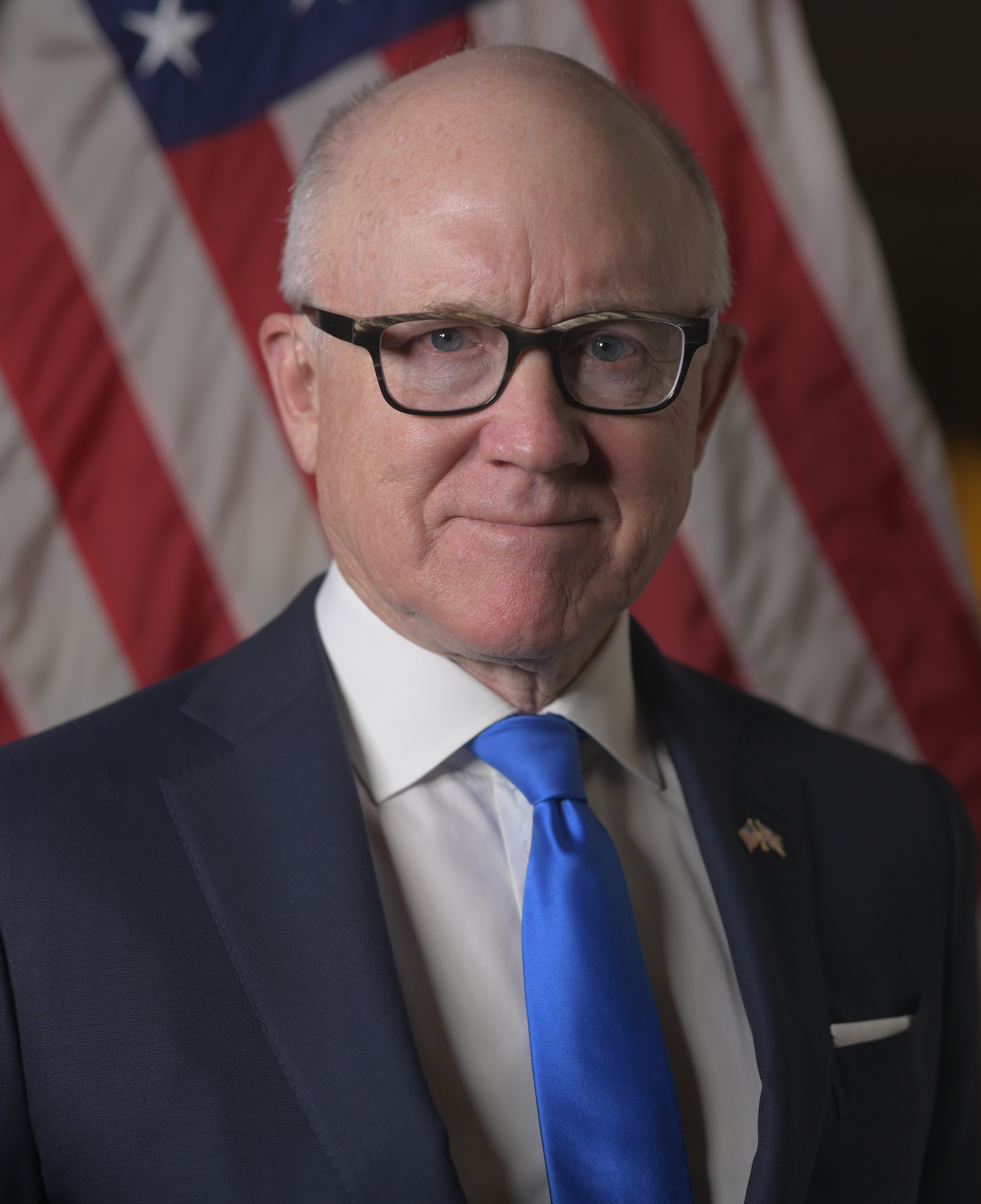
- Official portrait, 2020

66th United States Ambassador to the United Kingdom
- In office November 8, 2017 – January 20, 2021
- President: Donald Trump
- Preceded by: Matthew Barzun
- Succeeded by: Jane D. Hartley

Personal details
- Born: Robert Wood Johnson IV; April 12, 1947 (age 79) New Brunswick, New Jersey, U.S.
- Party: Republican
- Spouses: Nancy Sale Frey (m. 1977; div. 2001) Suzanne Ircha (m. 2009)
- Children: 5
- Parent(s): Bobby Johnson; Betty Wold
- Relatives: Christopher Johnson (brother)
- Education: University of Arizona (BA)
- Football career

New York Jets
- Title: Owner/chairman

Career history
- New York Jets (2000–present) Owner/chairman

Robert Wood Johnson IV (born April 12, 1947) is an American businessman and the owner and chairman of the NFL's New York Jets and was the United States ambassador to the United Kingdom from 2017 to 2021 during Donald Trump's first term. He is a great-grandson of Robert Wood Johnson I and an heir to the Johnson & Johnson pharmaceutical fortune. In 2000, he purchased the Jets for $635 million alongside his younger brother, Christopher Johnson.

A long-time Republican Party donor, Johnson was a supporter of Donald Trump's presidential campaign in 2016 and was subsequently appointed as the US Ambassador to the United Kingdom. Events during his tenure included Britain's exit from the EU and the relocation of the United States embassy in London. His brother Christopher took over Jets operations during his tenure.

Upon his return to the United States in 2021, Johnson resumed his role as chairman of the New York Jets. In 2022, Johnson made a £2 billion bid for Chelsea but withdrew from the bidding process later that month. In July 2025, Johnson completed the purchase of a 43% stake in Crystal Palace from Eagle Football Holdings, becoming a partner and director of the club.

== Early life and education ==
Johnson was born in New Brunswick, New Jersey, the son of Betty Johnson (née Wold; 1921–2020) and Robert Wood Johnson III, and the great-grandson of Robert Wood Johnson I, who founded the Johnson & Johnson pharmaceutical company, along with his brothers James Wood Johnson and Edward Mead Johnson. Robert Wood Johnson IV grew up with four siblings: Keith Johnson, Billy Johnson, Elizabeth "Libet" Johnson, and Christopher Wold Johnson, in northern New Jersey, and attended the Millbrook School. He graduated from the University of Arizona. He worked for J&J for a single summer.

== Career ==
=== The Johnson Company, Inc ===
Johnson was the chairman and chief executive of The Johnson Company, Inc., a private investment firm.

In 2006, a Senate subcommittee produced a 370-page report that said that some prominent figures, including Johnson, purchased capital gain losses as a way to reduce their own income tax bills. Johnson settled with the IRS in 2006, agreeing to pay the owed taxes plus interest.

Johnson was the committee president of the Pre-Commissioning Unit for the San Antonio-class ship USS New York (LPD-21).

=== New York Jets ===
In January 2000, Woody Johnson purchased the New York Jets from the estate of Leon Hess for $635 million. At the time, it was the third-highest price ever paid for a professional sports team, and the highest for a New York professional sports team. As of December 2024, Forbes estimated the value of the team at $6.9 billion.

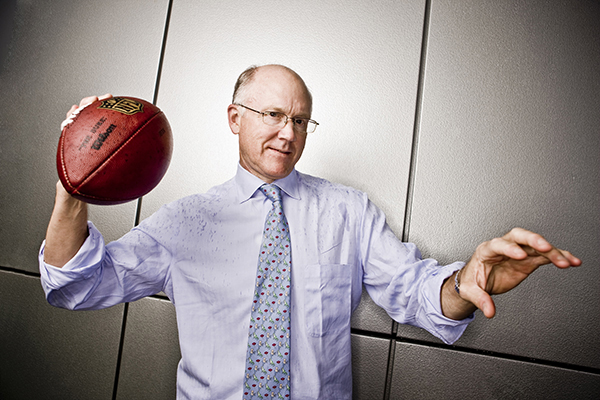
Woody Johnson in 2008

Following his acquisition of the Jets, Johnson moved the team to the newly constructed Meadowlands Stadium, sharing it as an equal partner with the New York Giants. The stadium, later named MetLife Stadium, officially opened on April 10, 2010.

In 2017, upon being appointed the U.S. Ambassador to the United Kingdom, Johnson's brother, Christopher Johnson, assumed the roles of CEO and acting owner of the Jets. Woody Johnson resumed his position as chairman in 2021 after returning to the United States, with Christopher Johnson becoming vice-chairman.

In January 2023, Johnson expressed the need for a strong quarterback to complement the Jets' robust defense, describing it as the "missing piece" in the team's lineup. He pursued four-time MVP Aaron Rodgers, who was traded to the Jets in 2023. Johnson has been widely criticized for his handling of the Jets. As of 2025, the team has had the longest active playoff drought in the NFL, with one season above .500.

Johnson fired Robert Saleh during the 2024 season; Saleh finished 20–36 and without a winning season. In January 2025, Johnson hired Aaron Glenn as the team's new head coach and Darren Mougey as the new general manager. In his statement on the hiring, Johnson expressed his desire to play a less active role in the team's day-to-day management, stating "I want Aaron Glenn to coach the team and I want the general manager to manage the assets and players and I'll take an owner's position."

Under Johnson, the New York Jets Foundation has funded charitable programs related to youth sports, military veterans, education and medical research. The Jets have held walk-a-thons, benefit luncheons, and other events related to the Lupus Research Alliance, which Johnson founded. In 2001, the team partnered with the Public Schools Athletic League. In 2015, Johnson received the Steinberg DeNicola Humanitarian Award for NFL owners who engage in philanthropy.

Johnson also helped the league select a successor to NFL Commissioner Paul Tagliabue.

=== Aston Martin Aramco Formula One Team ===
In August 2026, Johnson acquired a minority stake in the Aston Martin Aramco Formula One Team and became vice chairman of its board of directors. It was reported that Johnson will not participate in day-to-day management of the team, and will focus on commercial expansion, especially in regions such as the United States.

=== Women's flag football ===
Beginning in 2011, the Jets have also sponsored hundreds of girls' flag football programs, in the United States, the United Kingdom, and Ireland. Through the Betty Wold Johnson Foundation, Johnson made a $1 million grant to the Eastern College Athletic Conference for the establishment of the ECAC / Jets Women's Flag Football League. The league was established based on the success of the Jets' high school level girls' flag football programs. It is the largest collegiate women's flag football league, and launched its first season at the MetLife Stadium in February 2026. Its inaugural championship was held in 2026, with eight teams competing for the Betty Trophy.

=== Other sports ventures ===
In March 2022, Johnson made a £2 billion bid to purchase London football club Chelsea from sanctioned billionaire Roman Abramovich, but was later reported to be no longer in contention.

In June 2025, Johnson agreed to acquire Eagle Football Holdings' stake in Crystal Palace from a company associated with John Textor. The acquisition was completed on July 24, 2025, with Johnson purchasing a 42.92% interest in the club, as confirmed by the Premier League. He subsequently joined the club's ownership group as a partner and director.

=== Net worth ===
Johnson is a billionaire. As a fourth-generation descendant of one of the founders of the Johnson & Johnson company, he is one of the heirs of the Johnson family fortune. (Note: Initially owned entirely by the Johnson family, Johnson & Johnson began to be traded publicly in 1944. Robert Wood Johnson II (Woody Johnson's grandfather) continued to be chief executive until his retirement in 1963.) In a 2017 financial disclosure form, Johnson listed his net worth at $4.2 billion, with most of his wealth tied to his ownership of the Jets and its stadium; he also reported owning at least 1.56 million J&J shares (a stake then valued at more than $50 million). As of April 2024, the Bloomberg Billionaires Index placed his net worth at an estimated $9.92 billion.

== Political fundraising and endorsements ==
By the year 2000, Johnson had given more than $1 million to various Republican candidates and committees. Between 1997 and 1998, he donated $130,000 to the Republican Party, along with donating $22,583 to George W. Bush's 1998 gubernatorial re-election campaign of Texas. He was later a major New York fundraiser for Bush's 2000 presidential campaign.

In May 2008, he orchestrated a fundraiser in New York City that brought in $7 million in a single evening for John McCain's presidential campaign, by far the largest amount collected up to that point by a campaign that had been struggling to raise money. Johnson also provided significant funding to 2008 Republican National Convention host committee; from a $10 million shortfall, Johnson contributed personally and solicited friends to assist in covering the convention deficit. In 2011, Johnson endorsed former Massachusetts Governor Mitt Romney in the 2012 Republican presidential primaries. In September 2013, Johnson hosted a fundraiser for the Republican National Committee (RNC) at his home in New York City.

By 2016, Johnson had known Donald Trump for about 30 years, with the two men having social connections. Nevertheless, in the 2016 Republican presidential primaries, Johnson initially endorsed Jeb Bush over Trump. In June 2015, Johnson was named the national finance chairman for Bush's campaign. On several occasions, Trump singled out Johnson in a speech attacking Bush for accepting "special interest" money from donors. In May 2016, after Trump became the presumptive nominee, Johnson endorsed Trump for president. He met with Trump at Trump Tower and was named one of the RNC's six finance vice chairmen, responsible for an effort to raise $1 billion on behalf of Trump's campaign.

Johnson had by August 2019 donated $1.5 million to Donald Trump's presidential campaigns and inaugural committee. In February 2020, Johnson gave $575,000 to a fundraising committee for Trump's 2020 re-election campaign, and $355,000 to the RNC. In May 2020, he gave $1 million to America First Action, Inc., a pro-Trump super PAC.

On January 8, 2021, Johnson released a statement condemning the 2021 United States Capitol attack.

In 2023, Johnson gave at least $1 million to a super PAC backing Trump's 2024 presidential campaign. He stood behind Trump at an election-night rally during the 2024 South Carolina primary.

In 2025, the family's Betty Wold Johnson Foundation was one of the donors who funded the White House's East Wing demolition, and planned building of a ballroom.

== Ambassador to Britain (2017–2021) ==
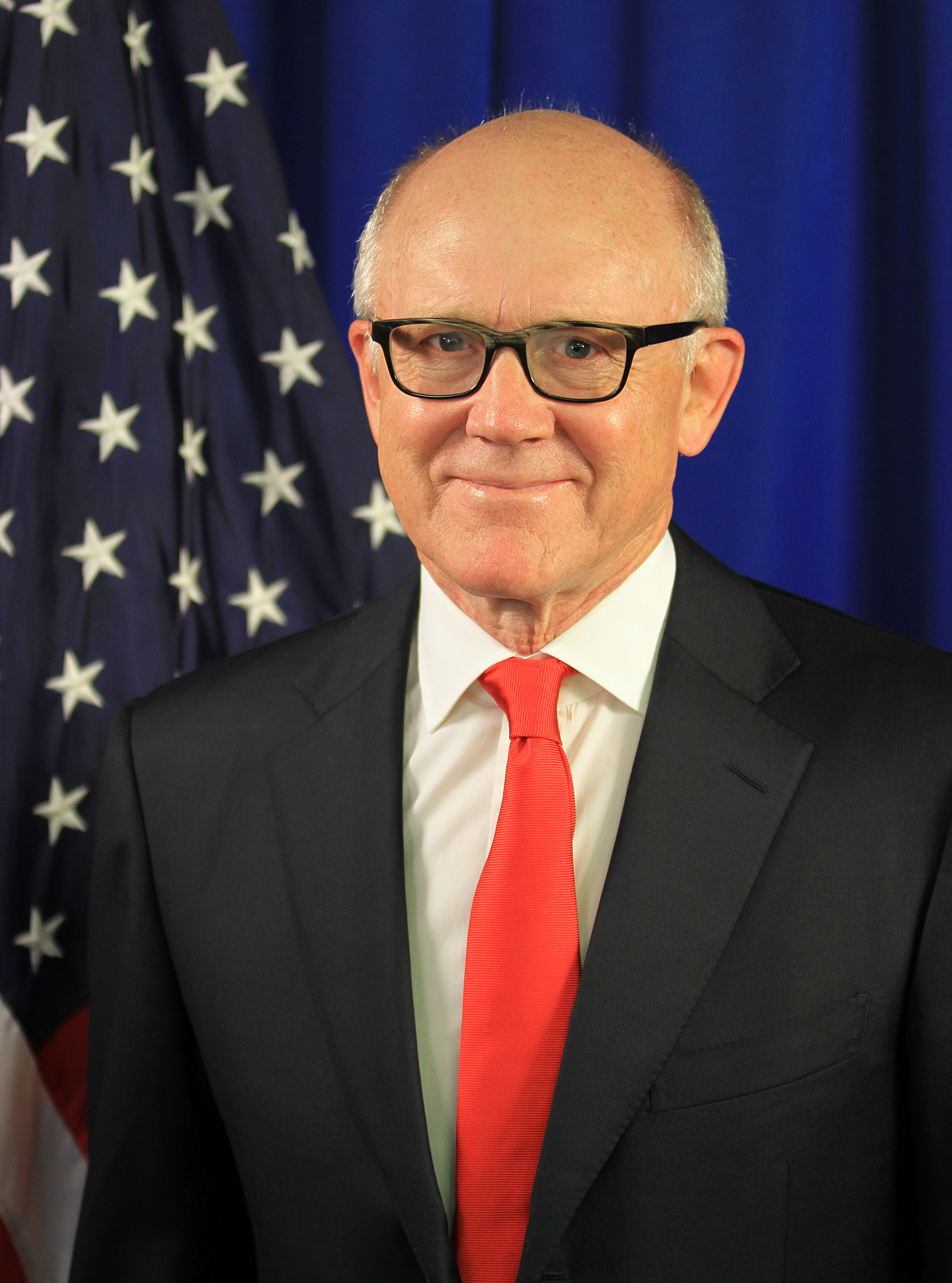
Johnson's first official Ambassador portrait

On January 19, 2017, President-elect Donald Trump announced that he planned to nominate Johnson to become United States Ambassador to the United Kingdom. On June 22, 2017, Trump nominated Johnson for the position. Prior to becoming ambassador, he had no diplomatic experience.

Following a hearing in the Senate Committee on Foreign Relations, Johnson was confirmed by the U.S. Senate on August 3, 2017, by voice vote. He was sworn in by Vice President Mike Pence on August 21, 2017, in the Oval Office. Johnson presented his credentials to Queen Elizabeth II on November 8, 2017.

In 2018, Johnson oversaw the relocation of the United States Embassy in London from Grosvenor Square, where it had been since 1938, to a new location in Nine Elms.

=== Brexit ===
During Johnson's tenure, Britain withdrew from the EU. Johnson advocated for a bilateral US-UK trade deal post-Brexit, in line with President Trump's hopes during that time, at one point mentioning that this could include the National Health Service and agricultural sector. Johnson had a private dinner with Queen Elizabeth II at Winfield House on March 14, 2019, just two days after British Parliament rejected Theresa May's Brexit plan.

=== Agriculture ===
Johnson advocated for closer agricultural trade between the US and UK, and the deregulation of US food exports to Britain. In March 2019, Johnson wrote an article in the Daily Telegraph saying that chlorinated chicken was a "public safety no-brainer" and that health fears over hormone-fed beef were "myths". This came after he urged the UK to open up to the US agriculture market after the British exit from the European Union and ignore the "smear campaign" of those with "their own protectionist agenda". Johnson was criticized by several British agriculture standard boards, such as the Red Tractor Assurance whose CEO, Jim Moseley stated the UK's food standards were "now under threat from ... the United States food lobby". Minette Batters, president of the UK National Farmers Union, agreed with Johnson's claims that chlorine-rinsed chicken was safe for consumption, but stated that factors such as animal welfare and environmental protection also had to be considered. Batters commented that accepting US agricultural products produced in ways that would be illegal in the UK would "put British producers out of business". The US National Farmers Union maintained that US methods of meat production were "safe", describing criticism as "fear-mongering".

=== Huawei ===
Johnson advised the UK government to ban Huawei from being used in the nation's 5G networks after departing Prime Minister Theresa May approved the company in early 2019. Johnson said that Huawei could represent an economic and security risk, comparing it to "letting a kleptomaniac move into your house." In 2020, after Britain decided to ban Huawei from its 5G mobile networks, Johnson welcomed the decision as a victory for human rights and fair trading practices.

=== Allegations of "inappropriate or insensitive comments" to embassy staff ===
In July 2020, the State Department investigated allegations made by some current and former staff members that accused Johnson of making inappropriate comments about issues concerning race, personal appearance, and Black History Month.

Johnson denied the allegations, asserting that the claims were inconsistent with his values and record. The State Department and the U.S. Embassy in London stood by Johnson, highlighting his professional conduct and dedication to U.S.-UK relations. While an Inspector General report on the matter was pending, Johnson maintained that he had always followed ethical guidelines and that the accusations did not reflect his long-standing principles.

After the investigation, the inspector general issued a report in August 2020 that said that Johnson "sometimes made inappropriate or insensitive comments on topics generally considered Equal Employment Opportunity (EEO)-sensitive, such as religion, sex, or color" that could "create an offensive working environment" and violate EEO (antidiscrimination) laws.

The inspector general's office recommended that the State Department's Bureau of European and Eurasian Affairs and Office of Civil Rights (S/OCR) coordinate an investigation into Johnson's conduct. S/OCR did so, and found that allegations against Johnson were unsubstantiated.

=== British Open at Trump Turnberry ===
In February 2018, Johnson as ambassador sought to have the lucrative British Open golf tournament moved to Trump's Turnberry Golf Resort in Scotland, raising the idea with Secretary of State for Scotland David Mundell. The New York Times reported, and the former deputy chief of mission at the U.S. embassy in London Lewis Lukens later confirmed, that Trump had asked Johnson to seek British government influence in obtaining the Open for Turnberry. At the time Lukens warned Johnson not to raise the question with the UK government, saying that an attempt to further the president's personal financial interests in this way would be unethical and probably illegal. Johnson did so anyway, unsuccessfully.

In a statement, the British government denied that Johnson "made no request of Mr. Mundell regarding the British Open or any other sporting event". Trump denied ever speaking to Johnson about Turnberry, and Johnson stated that he complied with "the ethical rules and requirements of my office". Lukens documented his concerns to State Department officials. Johnson forced out Lukens several months later, before the scheduled end of his tenure in London. The report that Johnson used his position as ambassador to promote the president's personal business interests sparked an inquiry by the State Department inspector general's office. In an interview in August 2020, Lukens said that the inspector general's report had halted without a public report being issued, which he considered unusual.

== Personal life ==
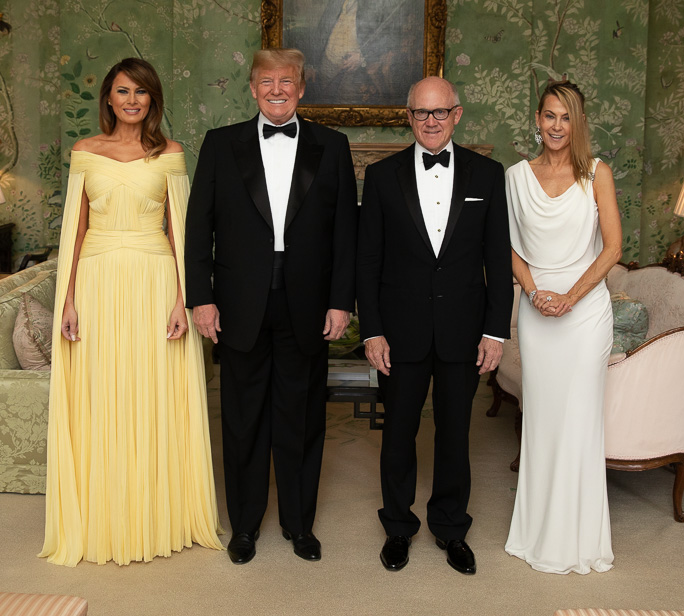
Woody Johnson and his wife Suzanne Ircha Johnson with President Donald Trump and First Lady Melania Trump

In 1977, Johnson married former fashion model Nancy Sale Johnson. They had three children before divorcing in 2001. In early 2010, eldest daughter Casey Johnson died of diabetic ketoacidosis at the age of 30. He started a research foundation, the Alliance for Lupus Research, after his daughter Jaime was found to have lupus.

In 2009, Johnson married Suzanne Ircha, a former actress and equities managing director at Sandler O'Neill and Partners. They have two children. Suzanne comes from a Ukrainian American family. Her father emigrated from Ternopil, Ukraine, after World War II. She was raised in New York City and began her career at Bear Stearns before joining Sandler O'Neill. She was away from the office when Sandler O'Neill's headquarters in the World Trade Center was destroyed during the September 11 attacks. She subsequently participated in the firm's rebuilding efforts.

Johnson has homes in Bedminster Township, New Jersey, and Palm Beach island in Florida, residing in the latter since 2020. He formerly had an apartment in Manhattan, but sold the unit (a two-floor duplex at 834 Fifth Avenue) in 2014 to billionaire Leonard Blavatnik for $80 million, setting a record for the costliest co-op ever sold in New York.

== Philanthropy ==
Johnson is known for philanthropy, especially donations to medical research. He raised money and lobbied to increase federal funding for lupus and diabetes. Johnson is also a trustee of the Robert Wood Johnson Jr. Charitable Trust. He is the only member of the Johnson family to be invited to join the board of the Robert Wood Johnson Foundation.

=== Diabetes research ===
Johnson was the chairman of the Juvenile Diabetes Foundation International. He and his wife became involved with diabetes charities after his daughter Casey was diagnosed with diabetes in 1988. In 1994, he co-wrote the book Managing Your Child's Diabetes with his wife Nancy, and Casey. As of 2000, he had donated $12 million to the foundation. Johnson was a chairman on the Council on Foreign Relations, and successfully lobbied Congress to approve a five-year, $750 million package for funding diabetes research in 2002.

Casey died of diabetic ketoacidosis on January 4, 2010. On October 24, 2012, Johnson wrote an opinion piece in The Wall Street Journal titled "The Folly of Defunding Diabetes Research", which urged Congress to approve long-term funding for the Special Diabetes Program. He visited the University of Birmingham in 2018 to discuss the university's diabetes research and research library.

=== Lupus research ===
Johnson is the founding chairman of the Lupus Research Alliance (formerly the Alliance for Lupus Research), which grants funding for research on improved diagnostics, treatments and prevention of lupus. He founded the legacy organization, Alliance for Lupus Research, in 1999 after his daughter Jaime was diagnosed with lupus. Johnson stated that the organization was meant to encourage public and scientific interest in lupus, which was understudied in comparison to many other chronic diseases. In 2023, the LRA partnered with the FDA to establish the Lupus Accelerating Breakthroughs Consortium, which works to improve the efficacy of clinical trials for lupus treatments.

=== Ukraine ===
During the ongoing 2022 Russian invasion of Ukraine, Johnson and his wife Suzanne, who comes from a Ukrainian background, have organized aid efforts for Ukraine. Their family visited Poland, which is the primary destination for Ukrainian refugees displaced by the crisis. While in Poland, they made visits to community centers, shelters, and orphanages housing Ukrainian refugees. In an article for The Telegraph, Johnson urged the United States and the United Kingdom to aid Ukraine.

In April 2022, the Jets pledged a $1 million donation to Ukraine, to be distributed to various organizations, including Plast Scouting USA and United24.

== Notes ==
Diplomatic posts
Preceded by Matthew Barzun	United States Ambassador to the United Kingdom; 2017–2021	Succeeded by Jane D. Hartley
Sporting positions
Preceded by Hess Estate	New York Jets principal owner 2000–present	Incumbent
