= Robert Wood Johnson =

Robert Wood Johnson was the name shared by members of the family that descended from the President of Johnson & Johnson:

- Robert Wood Johnson I (1845–1910)
- Robert Wood Johnson II (1893–1968)
- Robert Wood Johnson III (1920–1970)
- Robert Wood Johnson IV (born 1947), the current owner of the New York Jets
- Robert Wood Johnson V, son of Robert Wood Johnson IV

== Organizations ==
Several organizations and institutions have been named for members of this family:

- Robert Wood Johnson Foundation in Princeton, New Jersey
- Robert Wood Johnson Medical School in Piscataway, New Jersey, and Camden, New Jersey
- Robert Wood Johnson University Hospital in New Brunswick, New Jersey

== See also ==
- Robert Ward Johnson, senator
- Robert Johnson (disambiguation)
