= James E. Burke =

American businessman (1925–2012)

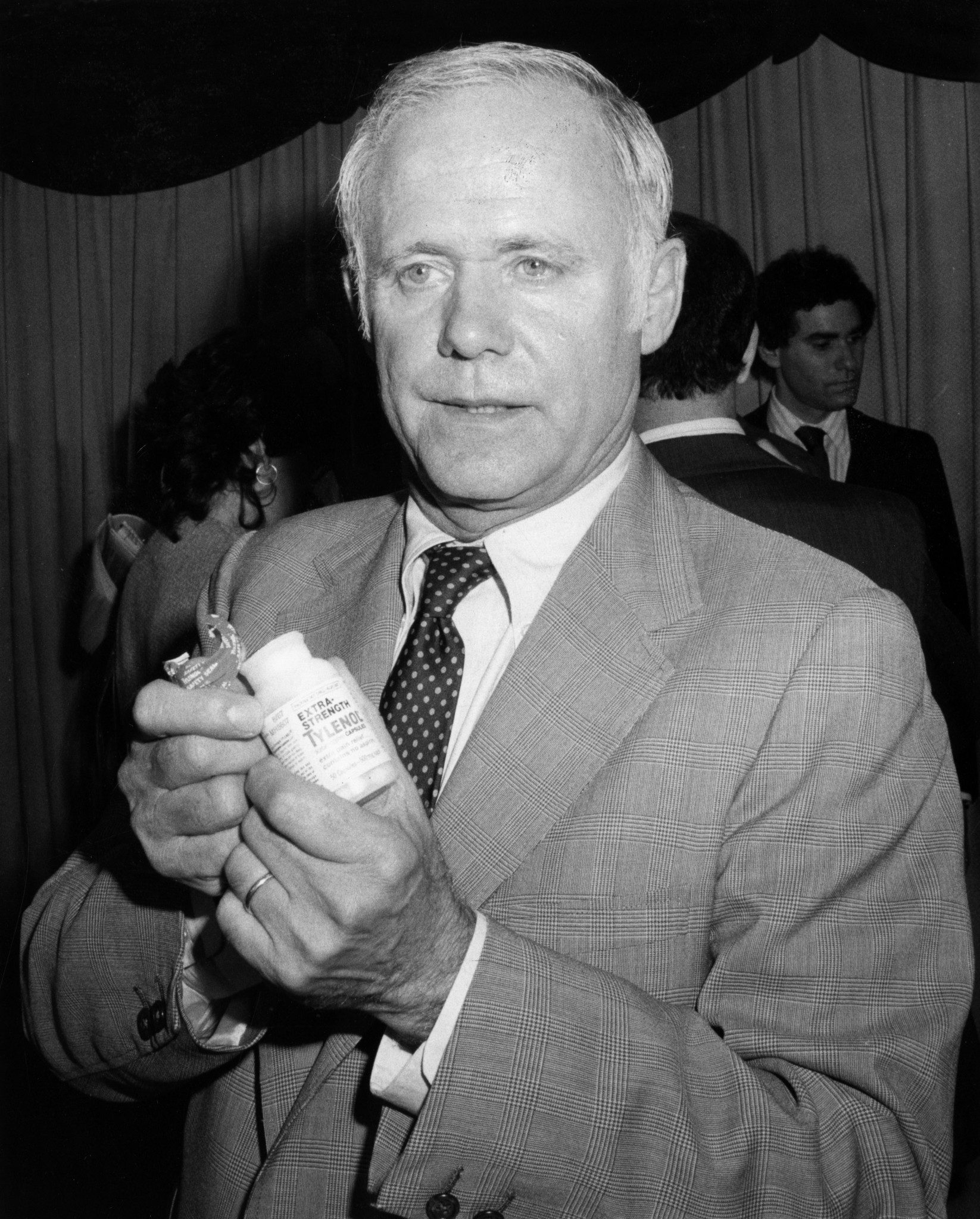
- Burke in 1982
- Born: February 28, 1925; Rutland, Vermont, U.S.
- Died: September 28, 2012 (aged 87); New Brunswick, New Jersey, U.S.
- Education: College of the Holy Cross (BS); Harvard University (MBA)
- Title: CEO of Johnson & Johnson
- Children: 2
- Relatives: Daniel Burke (brother); Steve Burke (nephew); Felix Wormser (father-in-law)
- Awards: American Academy of Arts and Sciences (1993); Jefferson Award (1993); Presidential Medal of Freedom (2000)
- Military career
- Allegiance: United States
- Branch: United States Navy
- Service years: 1941–1945
- Conflicts: World War II; Pacific Theater

James Edward Burke (February 28, 1925 – September 28, 2012) was an American businessman who was the chief executive officer (CEO) of Johnson & Johnson (J&J) from 1976 to 1989, where he worked for forty years. The company's revenue tripled to more than $9 billion under his tenure.

Burke was best known as the head of Johnson & Johnson during the 1982 Chicago Tylenol murders, after which he chose to recall 31 million bottles of Tylenol at the expense of $100 million, ultimately relaunching the product with a tamper-proof design. His actions became a prominent case of successful crisis management, and have served as a standard case study for numerous business practices.

In 2000, he was one of few CEOs to be awarded the Presidential Medal of Freedom. In 2003, Fortune magazine named Burke as one of the greatest CEOs in history.

== Early life and education ==
Burke was born in Rutland, Vermont, on February 28, 1925, to James Burke, a former marble salesman turned insurance salesman, and Mary Barnett Burke, a homemaker. He was raised middle-class in the small town of Slingerlands, New York, near Albany. Multiple members of his family were later successful in business. Burke's younger brother, Daniel, became president of the American Broadcasting Company (ABC). His two sisters, Phyllis Davis and Sidney Burke Carroll, were a cosmetics executive and lawyer, respectively. One nephew, Stephen Burke, is the senior executive vice president of Comcast and chairman of NBCUniversal.

As a child, Burke collected and sold daffodils found near his Albany home and offered a portion of the profits to the field owner. He also peddled Christmas trees and strawberries. "I was a marketing person beginning in fourth grade," Burke recalled. He was influenced by his father, who taught each of his children to debate.

After being educated at the Vincentian Institute, a rigorous Catholic high school in Albany, Burke attended the College of the Holy Cross, where he was a member of the college's Naval Reserve Officers Training Corps (NROTC) program, along with yearbook, band, and business clubs. During World War II, he served as an ensign in the United States Navy and commanded a landing craft tank (LCT) in the Pacific Theater.

Burke returned to Holy Cross after the war, graduating in 1947 with a Bachelor of Science (B.S.) in economics, and writing a senior thesis titled "Federal Trade Commission and Advertising." He then enrolled in Harvard Business School and earned a Master of Business Administration (M.B.A.) in 1949. Many of Burke's classmates at Harvard also became prominent business leaders, including Thomas Murphy, chair and CEO of ABC. Years later, in a 1991 conversation at the Academy of Management, Burke said that he learned more of business through the undergraduate program at Holy Cross than he did throughout business school.

== Career ==
After graduating from Harvard, Burke became a sales representative for the consumer corporation Procter & Gamble. He remained there for three years as a brand manager before moving to assume a position as a director for Johnson & Johnson's product division (known as Johnson & Johnson Products) in 1953, tasked with selling the company's original first aid goods. Growing dissatisfied with the company's lack of product development, he initially planned to leave. After one year, Burke quit Johnson & Johnson, where "he found the environment and lack of innovation stifling." But after being persuaded that the company would be more tolerant of risk-taking, Burke returned three weeks later, arriving as the new head of the department.

Burke prioritized the development of new products as department head. In 1954, Burke launched a series of over-the-counter medicines for children, but they all proved unsuccessful. On one occasion, he was called to the office of J&J CEO Robert Wood Johnson II: "I was full of bravado. I thought I was going to get fired." Johnson instead congratulated Burke for his propensity for risk-taking.

J&J announced that Richard B. Sellars would step down as CEO as of November 1, 1976, and be replaced by Burke. As CEO, Burke is credited for the growth of Johnson & Johnson to its current size and prominence, but he is perhaps best known for his crisis management in 1982, when it was found that Tylenol capsules had been poisoned with cyanide.

In addition to his duties with Johnson & Johnson, Burke served as an outside director for IBM and was instrumental in the ousting of John Akers and bringing in former American Express and RJR Nabisco CEO Louis V. Gerstner Jr. to replace him.

Following his retirement, he was appointed the second chairman of the national nonprofit organization Partnership for a Drug-Free America (PDFA), formed by a consortium of advertising professionals who ran a research-based media campaign to discourage teenage use of illegal drugs such as marijuana. Burke was honored for his public service advertising work by then US president Bill Clinton, who awarded him the Presidential Medal of Freedom, the highest civilian award in the United States. Fortune magazine named him as one of the ten greatest CEOs of all time and he had a membership in the National Business Hall of Fame.

He received the Bower Award for Business Leadership in 1990. He was elected to the American Philosophical Society in 1991 and the American Academy of Arts and Sciences in 1993.

In 1993, Burke received the S. Roger Horchow Award for Greatest Public Service by a Private Citizen, an award given out annually by Jefferson Awards.

He was president of the Business Enterprise Trust that honored acts of courage, integrity and social conscience in business.

== Personal life ==
Burke married his first wife, Alice Llewellyn Eubank, in April 1957. He had two children with her: James Charles and Mary Clotilde. After Eubank's death, Burke married his second wife, Diane "Didi" Wormser (1927–2021), an artist who was the daughter of Felix Wormser, in 1981.

Business positions
Preceded by Richard B. Sellars	President of Johnson & Johnson; 1976–1989	Succeeded by Ralph S. Larsen
