= State Theatre (New Brunswick, New Jersey) =

Theater in New Brunswick, New Jersey, United States

State Theatre New Jersey
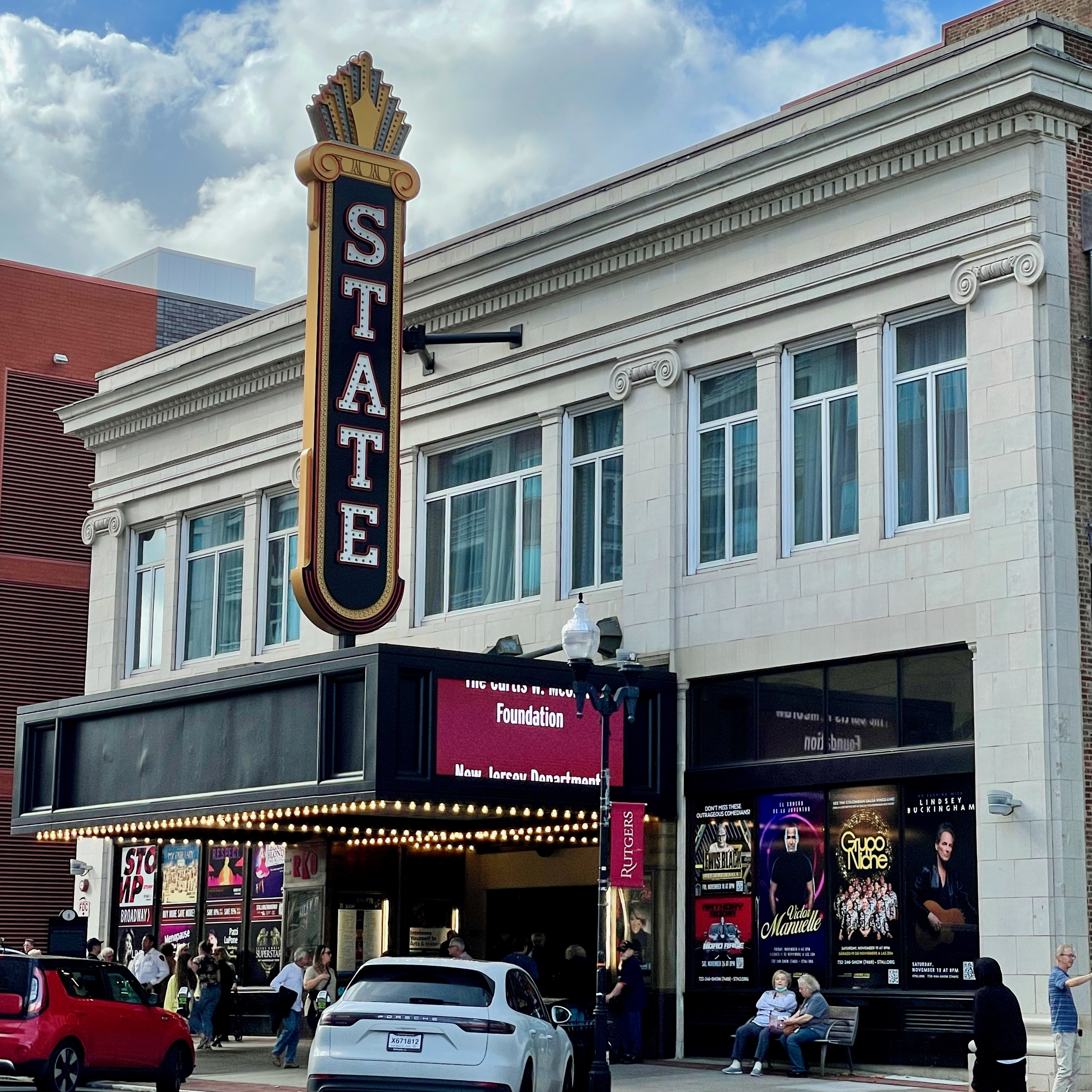

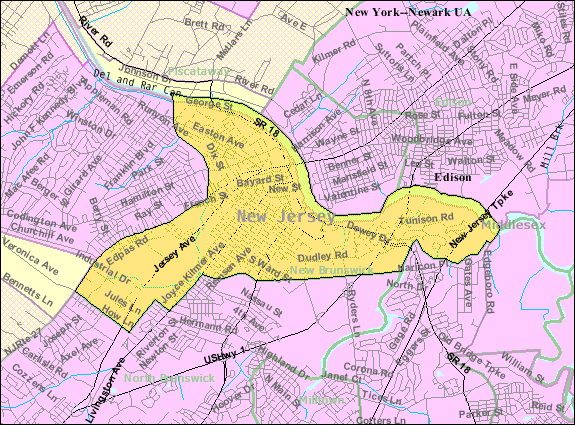
- Location in New Brunswick Location in New Jersey
- Address: 15 Livingston Ave; New Brunswick, New Jersey; United States
- Coordinates: 40.493341°N 74.44462°W
- Capacity: 1,800
- Public transit: New Brunswick station

Construction
- Opened: December 26, 1921
- Architect: Thomas W. Lamb

Website
- www.stnj.org

State Theatre New Jersey is a nonprofit theater, located in New Brunswick, New Jersey. It has seating for 1,850 people. Designed by architect Thomas W. Lamb in 1921, it is one of the oldest theaters in the State of New Jersey.

== History ==
The State Theatre was built in 1921 as Reade's State Theatre by Thomas W. Lamb and managed by Walter Reade for both movies and live performances. It opened with five vaudeville acts and a single matinee screening of the silent western White Oak, starring William S. Hart. Patrons, including first ticket buyer, nine-year-old Victor Levin, paid 20-30 cents per admission.

The theater was placed under the management of Benjamin Franklin Keith and Edward Franklin Albee II of B.F Keith Theatre chain, which then was the largest vaudeville theater chain in the early 1920s. After the death of Keith, Albee continued the operation and eventually merged with Orpheum, the largest western booking agency to form Keith-Albee-Orpheum (KAO).

In 1928, The Radio Corporation of America (RCA) acquired KAO as a subsidiary and KAO changed to Radio-Keith-Orpheum; also known as RKO. Within one year, the theater was equipped for sound.

In 1933 the RKO State Theatre underwent major renovations ending with a RKO Art-Deco renovation. With the advent of talking movies, the theater became a popular cinema for first-run movies beginning in 1939.

In the 1950s RKO State Theatre began to host rock ‘n’ roll shows featuring popular artists like The Satins, Chubby Checker, and more. This emerging genre led to yet another renovation of the theater adding acoustic tiles, which helped produce a booming sound.

In the 1970s, while continuing to host rock 'n' roll shows, the State Theatre drew in considerable audiences by embracing the Rocky Horror Picture Show.

== Revitalization ==
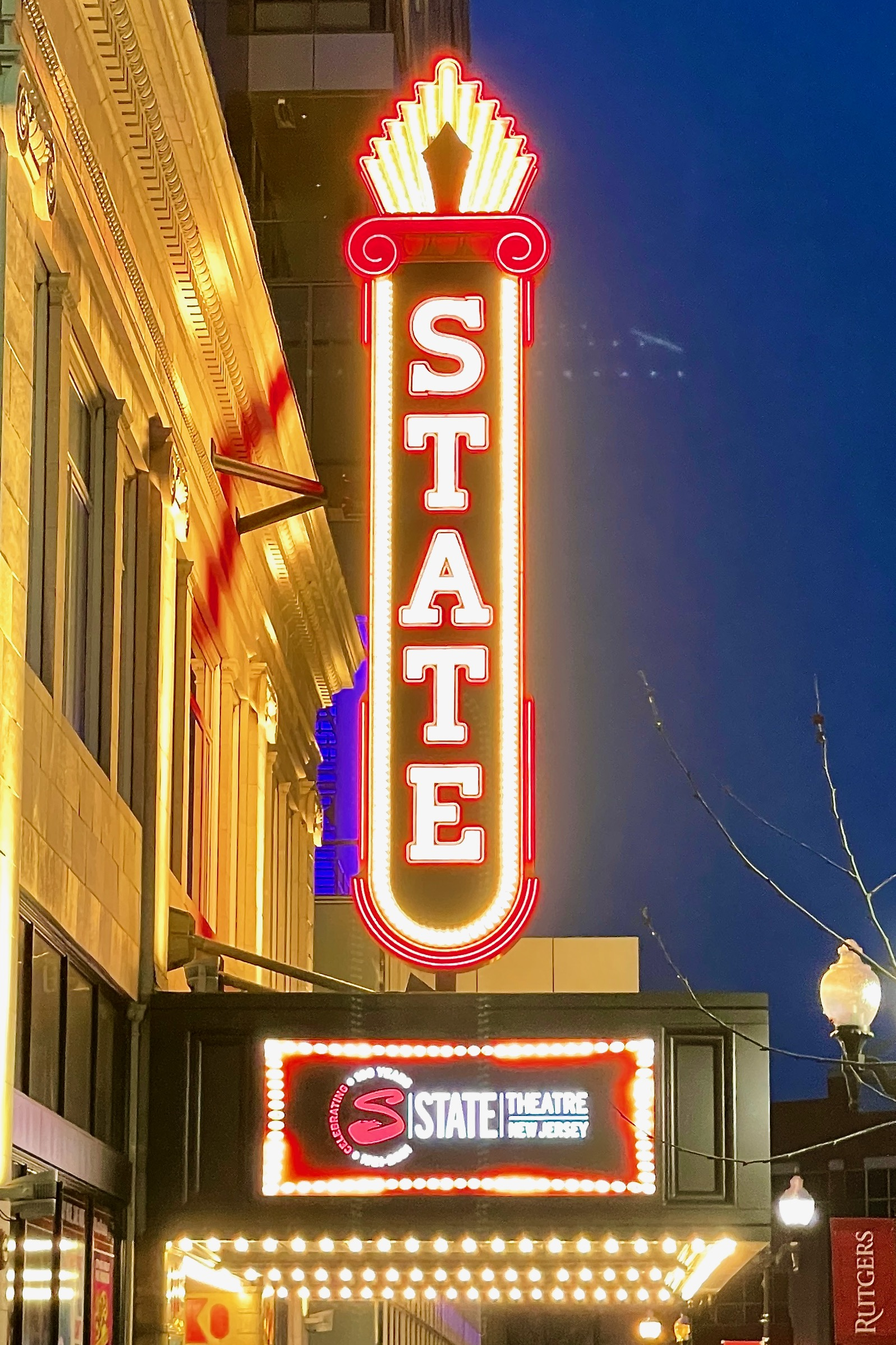
New blade marquee, installed 2021

The State Theatre continued to operate into the 1960s until audiences switched to multiplex cinemas. RKO sold the building to a business that showed adult movies and the structure declined. In 1979 it was purchased by the New Brunswick Development Corporation as part of New Brunswick's revitalization project for $455,000.

In 1986, the New Brunswick Cultural Center, led by Chairman Richard B. Sellars, former chairman and CEO of Johnson & Johnson acquired the State Theatre from the New Brunswick Development Corporation, and in 1987 began a $3 million renovation. The State Theatre reopened as a performing arts center on April 24, 1988, with a performance by the Jerusalem Symphony Orchestra.

In December 2003, with the help of the Middlesex County and Board of County Commissioners, the theater received $3 million for interior restoration. Up to 20 layers of paint were stripped away to determine the original color scheme. The ornamental plaster domed ceiling were repaired, and upgrades were made to the sound and lighting systems.

The theatre re-opened in October 2004 with a performance by comedian Jay Leno. In the summer of 2010, the State Theatre installed a new heating, ventilation, and air conditioning system costing $1 million provided by Middlesex County.

Today, State Theatre New Jersey continues to flourish as the centerpiece and premier venue for New Brunswick, New Jersey arts community. State Theatre presents a diverse roaster of entertainment, including international orchestras, Broadway, comedy, dance, pop, rock, family events, and more.

In addition to presenting mainstage performances, State Theatre New Jersey hosts over 180 education and community engagement programs reaching 30,000 students, teachers, and families each year, with performances, workshops, artist residencies, Sensory friendly performances, and other activities.

A new blade marquee was installed during the summer of 2021, as part of major renovations.

== Notable events ==
Artists who have performed at State Theatre New Jersey throughout the years include Phish, Ringo Starr, Diana Ross, Harry Connick Jr., David Copperfield, Frankie Valli, Bruce Springsteen, George Carlin, Lewis Black, kd lang, John Leguizamo, Tony Bennett and Aretha Franklin. The State Theatre has also hosted distinguished international orchestras such as the New York Philharmonic, the Philadelphia Orchestra, the Munich Symphony Orchestra, the Mariinsky Orchestra, and the BBC Concert Orchestra, among others.

On May 20, 2009, the State Theatre hosted the last performance by Peter, Paul, and Mary. Due to Mary Travers' long illness and continuing decline, the remaining shows that the trio had planned were either canceled, or only featured Peter Yarrow and Noel "Paul" Stookey. Mary Travers died of complications from chemotherapy on September 16, 2009.

On November 14, 2018, the historic State Theatre New Jersey was the focus of the second episode of NJTV's Treasures of New Jersey.
