= RWJ =

RWJ may refer to:

== People ==
- Ray William Johnson, American actor and comedian
- Roy Wood Jr., journalist and comedian
- Robert Ward Johnson, Democratic United States Senator and Confederate States Senator from the state of Arkansas

== Other uses ==
- RWJ Airpark, a public-use airport located in Beach City, Chambers County, Texas, United States
- RWJ-394674, a potent, orally active analgesic drug, which produces little respiratory depression
- RWJ-51204, is an anxiolytic drug used in scientific research.

== See also ==
- Robert Wood Johnson (disambiguation)
