= Television Academy Hall of Fame =

American television award

- Formation: March 4, 1984; 42 years ago
- Founder: John H. Mitchell
- Founded at: California, U.S.
- Type: Entertainment hall of fame
- Purpose: To honor individuals who have made extraordinary contributions to television in the United States
- Owner: Academy of Television Arts & Sciences
- Website: televisionacademy.com/awards/hall-of-fame

The Television Academy Hall of Fame honors individuals who have made extraordinary contributions to American television. The hall of fame was founded by former Academy of Television Arts & Sciences (ATAS) president John H. Mitchell (1921–1988). Inductions are not held annually.

== Synopsis ==
The awards were inaugurated in 1984, in the words of the selection committee, the Hall of Fame is for "persons who have made outstanding contributions in the arts, sciences or management of television, based upon either cumulative contributions and achievements or a singular contribution or achievement." John H. Mitchell served as the chair of the Hall of Fame until his death in January 1988. He was succeeded by Edgar Scherick, who was then replaced by Norman Lear.

The first ceremony was held in 1984, the inaugural inductees were Lucille Ball, Milton Berle, Paddy Chayefsky, Norman Lear, Edward R. Murrow, William S. Paley and David Sarnoff. The honorees received glass statuettes in the form of two ballet dancers that were created by sculptor and painter Pascal to reflect the self-discipline required in all facets of the arts. Since 1988, inductees have been given an award in the form of a crystal television screen atop a cast-bronze base. The award was designed by art director Romain Johnston.

Inductions are not held annually. Five or more inductees are announced at a time. All inductees have been individuals or pairs, with the exceptions of the series I Love Lucy in 1990, and the original cast of Saturday Night Live in 2017.

In 2016, the four broadcast networks (ABC, CBS, Fox and NBC) were honored with special "Hall of Fame Cornerstone" awards.

In 2018, following Bill Cosby's sexual assault cases, his 1991 induction was removed.

== Hall of Fame inductees ==
1st induction (1984)

- Lucille Ball
- Milton Berle
- Paddy Chayefsky
- Norman Lear
- Edward R. Murrow
- William S. Paley
- David Sarnoff

2nd induction (1985)

- Carol Burnett
- Sid Caesar
- Walter Cronkite
- Joyce Hall
- Rod Serling
- Ed Sullivan
- Pat Weaver

3rd induction (1986)

- Steve Allen
- Fred Coe
- Walt Disney
- Jackie Gleason
- Mary Tyler Moore
- Frank Stanton
- Burr Tillstrom

4th induction (1987)

- Johnny Carson
- Jacques Cousteau
- Leonard Goldenson
- Jim Henson
- Bob Hope
- Ernie Kovacs
- Eric Sevareid

5th induction (1988)

- Jack Benny
- George Burns and Gracie Allen
- Chet Huntley and David Brinkley
- Red Skelton
- David Susskind
- David L. Wolper

6th induction (1989)

- Roone Arledge
- Fred Astaire
- Perry Como
- Joan Ganz Cooney
- Don Hewitt
- Carroll O'Connor
- Barbara Walters

7th induction (1990)

- Desi Arnaz
- Leonard Bernstein
- James Garner
- I Love Lucy
- Danny Thomas
- Mike Wallace

8th induction (1991)

- ~~Bill Cosby~~ (revoked following his 2018 sexual assault cases)
- Andy Griffith
- Ted Koppel
- Sheldon Leonard
- Dinah Shore
- Ted Turner

9th induction (1992)

- John Chancellor
- Dick Clark
- Phil Donahue
- Mark Goodson
- Bob Newhart
- Agnes Nixon
- Jack Webb

10th induction (1993)

- Alan Alda
- Howard Cosell
- Barry Diller
- Fred W. Friendly
- William Hanna and Joseph Barbera
- Oprah Winfrey

11th induction (1995)

- Michael Landon
- Richard Levinson and William Link
- Jim McKay
- Bill Moyers
- Dick Van Dyke
- Betty White

12th induction (1996)

- Edward Asner
- Steven Bochco
- Marcy Carsey and Tom Werner
- Charles Kuralt
- Angela Lansbury
- Aaron Spelling
- Lew Wasserman

13th induction (1997)

- James L. Brooks
- Garry Marshall
- Quinn Martin
- Diane Sawyer
- Grant Tinker

14th induction (1999)

- Herbert Brodkin
- Robert MacNeil and Jim Lehrer
- Lorne Michaels
- Carl Reiner
- Fred Rogers
- Fred Silverman
- Ethel Winant

15th induction (2002)

- Tim Conway and Harvey Korman
- John Frankenheimer
- Bob Mackie
- Jean Stapleton
- Bud Yorkin

16th induction (2004)

- Bob Barker
- Charles Cappleman, executive
- Art Carney
- Katie Couric
- Dan Rather
- Brandon Tartikoff

17th induction (2006)

- Tom Brokaw
- James Burrows
- Leonard Goldberg
- Regis Philbin
- William Shatner

18th induction (2008)

- Bea Arthur
- Daniel Burke
- Larry Gelbart
- Merv Griffin
- Thomas Murphy
- Sherwood Schwartz

19th induction (2010)

- Candice Bergen
- Charles Lisanby
- Don Pardo
- Gene Roddenberry
- Smothers Brothers
- Bob Stewart

20th induction (2011)

- Diahann Carroll
- Tom Freston
- Earle Hagen
- Susan Harris
- Peter Jennings
- Cloris Leachman
- Bill Todman

21st induction (2012)

- Mary-Ellis Bunim and Jonathan Murray
- Michael Eisner
- Sherman Hemsley
- Bill Klages
- Mario Kreutzberger
- Chuck Lorre
- Vivian Vance and William Frawley

22nd induction (2013)

- Philo Farnsworth
- Ron Howard
- Al Michaels
- Les Moonves
- Bob Schieffer
- Dick Wolf

23rd induction (2014)

- Ray Dolby
- David E. Kelley
- Jay Leno
- Julia Louis-Dreyfus
- Rupert Murdoch
- Brandon Stoddard

Cornerstone Award (2016)

- ABC
- CBS
- Fox
- NBC

24th induction (2017)

- Original Saturday Night Live cast: Dan Aykroyd, John Belushi, Chevy Chase, Jane Curtin, Garrett Morris, Laraine Newman and Gilda Radner
- Roy Christopher
- Shonda Rhimes
- Joan Rivers
- John Wells

25th induction (2020)

- Bob Iger
- Geraldine Laybourne
- Seth MacFarlane
- Jay Sandrich
- Cicely Tyson

26th induction (2022)

- Debbie Allen
- Ken Burns
- Bob Daly
- Robert L. Johnson
- Rita Moreno
- Donald A. Morgan, ASC

27th induction (2025)

- Viola Davis
- Don Mischer
- Ryan Murphy
- Conan O'Brien
- Mike Post
- Henry Winkler

28th induction (2026)

- Ed Bradley
- Ted Danson
- Sheila Nevins
- Trey Parker and Matt Stone
- Ted Sarandos
- Jean Smart

== See also ==
- NAB Broadcasting Hall of Fame
