= Robert Wood Johnson III =

American businessman

President of Johnson & Johnson
- In office 1961–1965
- Preceded by: Robert Wood Johnson II
- Succeeded by: Philip B. Hofmann

Personal details
- Born: September 9, 1920 New Brunswick, New Jersey, U.S.
- Died: December 22, 1970 (aged 50) Fort Lauderdale, Florida, U.S.
- Spouse: Betty Wold (m. 1943)
- Children: 5, including Woody and Christopher
- Parent(s): Robert Wood Johnson II; Elizabeth Dixon Ross Johnson
- Education: Millbrook School
- Alma mater: Hamilton College; University of Kentucky
- Occupation: Businessman

Robert Wood Johnson III (September 9, 1920 – December 22, 1970) was an American businessman. He was a grandson of Robert Wood Johnson I (co-founder of Johnson & Johnson).

== Early life ==
Johnson was born in New Brunswick, New Jersey. His father was Robert Wood Johnson II, president and chair of Johnson & Johnson, and his mother was Elizabeth Dixon Ross Johnson. An only child, his parents divorced in 1928 and his father married two more times, first in 1930 and again in 1944. From his father's second marriage, he had a younger half-sister, Sheila Johnson.

His paternal grandfather was Robert Wood Johnson I, one of the three brothers who founded Johnson & Johnson. His aunt Evangeline married composer Leopold Stokowski (after they divorced in 1937, he married Gloria Vanderbilt) and his uncle John Seward Johnson I founded the Harbor Branch Oceanographic Institution. His maternal grandfather was Millard Fillmore Ross.

He graduated from the Millbrook School in Dutchess County, New York, and attended Hamilton College in Clinton, New York and the University of Kentucky.

== Career ==
Johnson formally began working for Johnson & Johnson in 1941, but was interrupted by four years of Army service in England, France and Germany with the First and 14th Armored Divisions. In 1954, he was appointed to the executive committee of the board of directors and, in 1955, he became executive vice president for marketing. In 1960, he became executive vice president and general manager. He became president in 1961 and took on the duties of vice chairman of the executive committee in 1963. His tenure as president ended in 1965 when his father fired him. He was succeeded as president by Philip B. Hofmann, the first non-Johnson family member to head the company since 1887.

After his tenure as president ended, he established a cosmetics concern, Johnson Industries, in Menlo Park, but was unable to develop the business because of illness. Johnson also served for ten years on the board of directors of the Robert Wood Johnson Foundation as president and vice president.

== Personal life ==
In 1943, Johnson was married to Betty Wold, a daughter of Dr. Karl C. Wold of St. Paul, Minnesota. Together, they had five children, including:

- Robert Wood "Woody" Johnson IV (born 1947), who bought the New York Jets in 2000 for $635 million and served as the United States Ambassador to the United Kingdom under Donald Trump.
- Keith Wold Johnson (1948–1975), who died of a cocaine overdose in Fort Lauderdale.
- Elizabeth "Libet" Ross Johnson (c. 1951–2017), who died of Alzheimer's disease.
- Billy Johnson (c. 1952–1975), who died in a motorcycle accident in Los Angeles a few weeks after the death of his brother.
- Christopher Wold Johnson (born 1959), who became CEO of the New York Jets after Woody became ambassador to the United Kingdom.

Johnson died of cancer on December 22, 1970, at the age of 50, at Holy Cross Hospital in Fort Lauderdale, Florida. In 2008, his widow donated $11 million to New Jersey Performing Arts Center in what was then the largest individual donation in the arts center's history. Her 2008 gift was in addition to the more than $2 million she donated after the center opened in 1997. In 2025, the Betty Wold Johnson Foundation, named after Johnson's widow, was one of the donors which funded the White House's East Wing demolition and planned building of a ballroom.

Business positions
Preceded by Robert Wood Johnson II	President of Johnson & Johnson; 1961–1965	Succeeded by Philip B. Hofmann
