= James W. Johnson =

James W. Johnson may refer to:

- JW Johnson (James W Johnson - born 2003), American professional pickleball player
- James Weldon Johnson (1871–1938), African-American figure in the Harlem Renaissance
- James Wood Johnson (1856–1932), co-founder of the company Johnson and Johnson
