= Dan Burke =

Dan Burke may refer to:

- Dan Burke (baseball) (1868–1933), MLB utility player
- Dan Burke (basketball) (born 1959), NBA assistant coach
- Daniel Burke (executive) (1929–2011), former president of Capital Cities Communications and American Broadcasting Corporation
- Daniel J. Burke (born 1951), former Democratic member of the Illinois House of Representatives
