= Steve Burke (businessman) =

American businessman (born 1958)

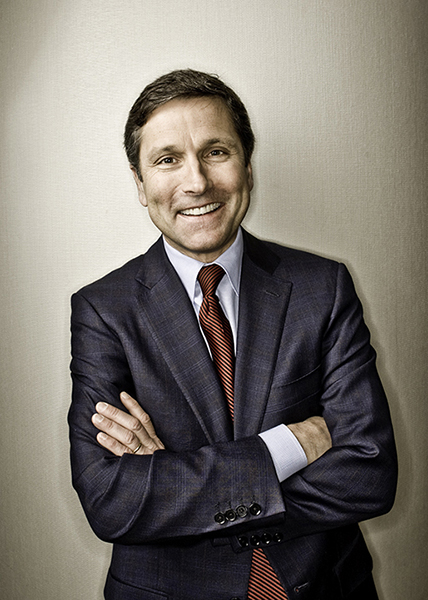
- Steve Burke when he was Comcast COO in 2008
- Born: August 14, 1958 (age 67)
- Education: Colgate University (BA); Harvard University (MBA)
- Occupations: Senior Executive Vice President of Comcast Corporation; Chairman of NBCUniversal
- Board member of: Berkshire Hathaway Inc. J.P. Morgan Chase & Co. Children's Hospital of Philadelphia
- Relatives: Daniel Burke (father); James E. Burke (uncle)

Stephen B. Burke (born August 14, 1958) is an American businessman. He is the senior executive vice president of Comcast and chairman of NBCUniversal.

== Early life ==
Burke's father, Daniel Burke, was a former executive of Capital Cities Communications, which acquired the ABC network. Steve Burke graduated from Colgate University in 1980. In 1982, Steve Burke graduated from Harvard Business School with an MBA.

== Career ==
Burke began his career as an associate product manager in the breakfast food division at General Foods. In January 1986, Burke joined The Walt Disney Company and founded the Disney Store concept for the consumer product division. From 1992 to 1996, Burke served as president and COO of Euro Disney. In 1996, Burke was named executive vice president of ABC after the Walt Disney Company purchased the network. The following year, Burke was named President of ABC Broadcasting.

In 1998, Burke left Disney and became President of Comcast Cable. In 2004, he was named Chief Operating Officer of Comcast Cable, in addition to his title of President. In 2010, it was announced that Burke would become CEO of NBCUniversal after Comcast and General Electric completed a merger. When Comcast and General Electric finished merging the assets of NBCUniversal with Comcast's programming assets the following year, Burke resigned his position as COO of Comcast before becoming CEO of NBCUniversal.

In 2018, Burke led Comcast's acquisition of British pay-TV company, Sky, after dropping out of the bidding war with Disney to purchase 21st Century Fox. In January 2019, Burke announced plans for NBCUniversal to launch a streaming service, later named Peacock, in 2020 using Sky's existing OTT video platform. Burke was succeeded as CEO of NBCUniversal by Jeff Shell in 2020 but remained as chairman of the company's board of directors.

As of 2009, Burke has served on the Board of Directors of Warren Buffett's Berkshire Hathaway and JPMorgan Chase. He has also served on the board of trustees of the Children's Hospital of Philadelphia.

As of 2021, Burke became a board member for onX Maps out of Missoula, Montana. Following being appointed to the onXmaps board, he made a major investment in onXmaps through his family's investment company Madison Valley Partners.

== Personal life ==
Steve Burke married his wife, Gretchen (née Hoadley) on July 23, 1983 and together they have five children. Burke has homes in New York City, Los Angeles and Rancho Cordova.

Business positions
| Preceded by Jeff Zucker | CEO of NBC; 2011-2019 | Succeeded by Jeff Shell |
