= Richard B. Sellars =

- Born: September 9, 1915; Worcester, Massachusetts, U.S.
- Died: June 25, 2010 (aged 94); Osterville, Massachusetts, U.S.
- Occupations: Businessman, philanthropist
- Known for: Chairman and CEO of Johnson & Johnson

Richard Beverland Sellars (September 9, 1915 – June 25, 2010) was an American business executive who was chairman and CEO of Johnson & Johnson as part of 40 years with the healthcare product firm. Sellars played a pivotal role in keeping the company's headquarters in New Brunswick, New Jersey, and worked to rebuild that city's downtown area.

Born on September 9, 1915, Sellars grew up in Worcester, Massachusetts. He attended American International College and Maryville College, but did not graduate from either school.

In 1939, Johnson & Johnson hired Sellars as a salesman in its Ortho Pharmaceutical business unit. He worked his way up and became Ortho's vice president by 1948. He was shifted to J&J's Ethicon Inc. unit and became its president in December 1949, succeeding Philip B. Hofmann. In April 1970, he became president of Johnson & Johnson Worldwide. He became Johnson & Johnson's chairman of the board and chief executive officer in 1973, becoming the second person from outside the Johnson family to lead the firm.

Sellars persuaded the firm's board to remain in the urban confines of New Brunswick, rather than move to the suburbs, and worked as part of the New Brunswick Development Corporation to help revitalize the city. He helped bring in I. M. Pei to redesign New Brunswick's downtown area. With headquarters in New Brunswick, he felt the firm had an obligation to the city and "the survival of our country depends on the survival of its cities, so we'd all better get involved in cleaning them up."

J&J announced that Sellars would step down as CEO as of November 1, 1976, and be replaced by James E. Burke. After stepping down as CEO, he was on the board's finance committee until 1979. From 1981 to 1996, he was a trustee of the Robert Wood Johnson Foundation, the largest philanthropy devoted exclusively to health and health care in the United States. He worked closely with Robert Wood Johnson II, who established the foundation, in shaping its goals and objectives.

Sellars died at age 94 at his home in Osterville, Massachusetts, on June 25, 2010. He was survived by his wife, the former Doris Sophia Johnson (no relation to the company's founders), and two daughters, two sons, 9 grandchildren, and 13 great-grandchildren. He and his wife had lived in Peapack-Gladstone, New Jersey.
