= Lupus Research Alliance =

American nonprofit organization

- Formation: 2016
- Founder: Woody Johnson
- Purpose: To find better treatments and ultimately prevent and cure systemic lupus erythematosus (SLE or lupus)
- Location: 52 Vanderbilt Ave, Suite 401, New York, NY 10017
- Website: www.lupusresearch.org

The Lupus Research Alliance (LRA) is an American voluntary health organization based in New York City whose mission is to find better treatments and ultimately prevent and cure systemic lupus erythematosus (SLE or lupus), a debilitating autoimmune disease, through supporting medical research. The organization was born from the merger of three organizations: the Lupus Research Institute (LRI) and the S.L.E. Lupus Foundation with the Alliance for Lupus Research (ALR), which was founded by Robert Wood "Woody" Johnson IV, a member of the Johnson & Johnson family and owner of the New York Jets. As of 2020 the LRA's cumulative research commitment was US$220,000,000.

== History ==
The Lupus Research Alliance (LRA) was founded as The Alliance for Lupus Research in 1999 by former chairperson Woody Johnson, a member of the founding family of Johnson & Johnson and owner of the New York Jets. The organizations's fundraising efforts include committing money to lupus research and charity walk-a-thons under the "Walk with Us to Cure Lupus" program, which raises funds and public awareness of the disease.

== Research funding ==
The hallmark of LRA's operations are an emphasis on multidisciplinary science. Research funded by the LRA has included the 2008 International SLE Genetics Consortium (SLEGEN), which identified several genes associated with lupus.

The Lupus Research Alliance has given more money to lupus research than any non-governmental agency in the world. As of 2015 the LRA's cumulative research commitment was over US$100,000,000, making it the largest lupus research organization and the only organization the funds lupus biomedical research internationally. One hundred percent of all donations from the public including donations in support of the "Walk with Us to Cure Lupus" program go directly to research programs because the LRA's board of directors funds all administrative and fundraising costs. LRA uses a peer review system to make all funding decisions.
