= Philip B. Hofmann =

American businessman

Philip B. Hofmann (May 25, 1909 – December 29, 1986) was an American businessman. He was the first non-family-member to serve as chairman and chief executive officer of the healthcare firm Johnson & Johnson.

== Biography ==
Philip Hofmann was born on May 25, 1909, in Ottumwa, Iowa, where his father was a pharmacist. He graduated from Ottumwa High School in 1926. He earned his undergraduate degree in 1930 at the Wharton School of the University of Pennsylvania with a major in economics.

=== Career ===
He was hired by Johnson & Johnson in 1931, starting work there as a shipping clerk. He went to work for Johnson & Johnson's newly formed Ortho Products division in Linden, New Jersey, and was the unit's president by 1944. He was named as Johnson & Johnson's chief executive officer in 1963 as the first non-family-member to lead the company, succeeding Robert Wood Johnson II. He served as CEO until 1974, when he was succeeded by Richard B. Sellars. He helped establish the Robert Wood Johnson Foundation, the largest philanthropy in the United States devoted exclusively to health and health care.

After having been nominated to the position by Governor of New Jersey William T. Cahill in July 1973, he resigned as one of the six commissioners representing the Garden State on the Port Authority of New York and New Jersey, citing a conflict with Governor Brendan Byrne over the Port Authority's role in mass transit.

=== Personal life ===
He was a resident of Monmouth Beach, New Jersey, and Surfside, Florida. He was an avid horse breeder, and owned Wycombe House Stud of Reddick, Florida, where the horses he raised included Gold Beauty, the American Champion Sprint Horse of 1982. He participated in horse shows, driving a four-in-hand. He died of a heart attack at age 77 on December 29, 1986, at the Miami Heart Institute in Miami Beach, Florida. He was survived by his wife, the former Georgia Felhaber, and two daughters and two grandchildren.
