= Bernardin-Johnson House =

Historic house in Indiana, United States

- U.S. National Register of Historic Places
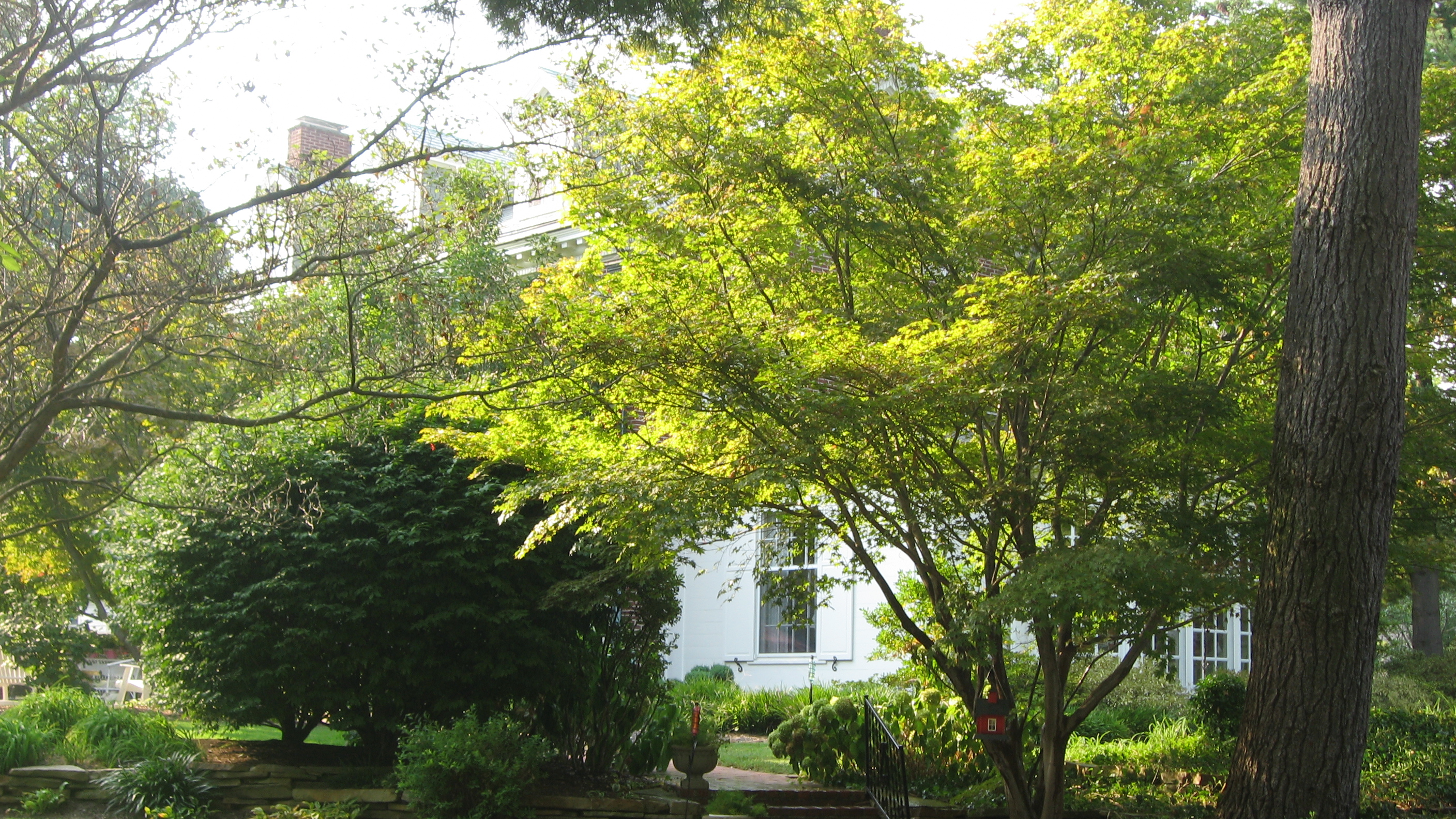
- Bernardin-Johnson House, September 2011

- Location within Indiana Location within the United States
- Location: 17 Johnson Pl., Evansville, Indiana
- Coordinates: 37°58′8″N 87°31′24″W
- Area: 1.5 acres (0.61 ha)
- Built: 1917
- Architect: Thole, Edward Joseph
- Architectural style: Colonial Revival, Georgian Revival
- NRHP reference No.: 89000238
- Added to NRHP: June 27, 1989

Bernardin-Johnson House is a historic home located at Evansville, Indiana. It was designed by Edward Joseph Thole of the architecture firm Clifford Shopbell & Co. and built in 1917. It is a 2 1/2-story, Georgian Revival / Colonial Revival style brick dwelling with a two-story wing. It has a slate gable roof and features a pedimented portico with fluted Ionic order columns. After 1919, it was owned by Edward Mead Johnson (1852–1934).

It was added to the National Register of Historic Places in 1989.
