= Felix Wormser =

Felix Edgar Wormser (died June 29, 1981) was an American engineering and former government official who served as Assistant Secretary of the Interior for Mineral Resources in the United States Department of the Interior from 1954 to 1957.

== Biography ==
Wormser was born in Santa Barbara, California and graduated from Columbia University, where he received a degree in mining engineering in 1916 from the Columbia School of Mines. At Columbia, he was a member of the men's varsity crew team.

He was employed by the United States Bureau of Mines until 1919, when he served in the United States Army. From 1920 to 1925, Wormser was a member of the editorial staff of McGraw Hill. He then worked as a consulting mining engineer from 1925 to 1947. He was a trustee of the American Institute of Mining, Metallurgical, and Petroleum Engineers from 1940 to 1945.

Wormser was secretary-treasurer of the Lead Industries Association and vice president of St. Joe Minerals from 1947 to 1953, when he was appointed Assistant Secretary for Mineral Resources by President Dwight D. Eisenhower.

Wormser was a close associate of President Eisenhower when he led Columbia University as president. He was a member of the board of trustees of Columbia and was tapped by Eisenhower to head a $12 million fundraising drive for an engineering center, which he belied was vital due to a lack of engineering and technical personnel in the United States vis-a-vis the Soviet Union.

In 1956, he received the Thomas Egleston Medal from Columbia School of Engineering and Applied Science, the highest award bestowed to alumni and graduates of the school.

He died at his home in Greenwich, Connecticut on June 29, 1981. He was 86 years old and was survived by his wife, two daughters, and nine grandchildren.
