= Edward Mead Johnson =

Co-founder of Johnson & Johnson

- Born: April 23, 1852; Evansville, Indiana, U.S.
- Died: March 20, 1934 (aged 81); Miami Beach, Florida, U.S.
- Burial place: Oak Hill Cemetery and Arboretum
- Education: University of Michigan
- Occupation: Businessman
- Known for: Co-founder of Johnson & Johnson; Founder of Mead Johnson

Edward Mead Johnson (April 23, 1852 – March 20, 1934) was an American businessman and one of the co-founders of Johnson & Johnson. In 1886, Edward Mead Johnson abandoned a career in law and joined his two brothers Robert Wood Johnson I, and James Wood Johnson to found Johnson & Johnson in New Brunswick, New Jersey. He left that family surgical supply business in 1895 to found what became Mead Johnson, which produces nutrition products for infants and children marketed in fifty countries around the world.

== Life and career ==
Johnson earned a degree in law from the University of Michigan and practiced law briefly before going into business with his brothers. He co-founded Johnson & Johnson together with his brothers James Wood Johnson and Robert Wood Johnson I, a company that remained privately held by the family until 1944, when the firm made its first public stock offering.

His first son, Ted, was born in 1888 with a congenital heart defect and feeding problems. In 1895, Johnson developed a side business, The American Ferment Company, to create a digestive aid. In 1897, E. Mead Johnson left the existing family business to go into business on his own in Jersey City, New Jersey, and in 1905, his side business was re-established as Mead Johnson & Company. The firm's first major infant formula was developed in 1910, and Dextri-Maltose, a carbohydrate-based milk modifier was introduced in 1911, making it the first American product for infants to be approved clinically and recommended by physicians. The creation of Dextri-Maltose was provoked by problems experienced feeding his first son as an infant, which became life-threatening.

The firm moved to Evansville, Indiana, in 1915, as part of an effort to have easier access to the raw agricultural ingredients that were needed for its products. The relocation required Johnson to build a series of new plants and factories to replace the facilities he had left behind in New Jersey.

Johnson retired from the firm and devoted his time to deep-sea fishing and golf. He was an active member of community organizations in Evansville and contributed the money needed to acquire a building used by an organization that fed sick babies, insisting that the donation remained anonymous until his death. The Evansville Business Journal inducted Johnson into its Business Hall of Fame in 2007.

Johnson died at age 81 on March 20, 1934, of a heart attack suffered at his winter home in Miami Beach, Florida. His body was transported back to Evansville for burial.

Another son, Lambert, succeeded him as president of Mead Johnson following his death and served in the position until 1955, making him the longest-serving president in the history of the company.

His home at Evansville, the Bernardin-Johnson House, was added to the National Register of Historic Places in 1989.
