= New Brunswick Development Corporation =

- Formation: 1976; 50 years ago
- Founder: Richard B. Sellars
- Headquarters: New Brunswick, New Jersey
- Key people: Christopher Paladino, President
- Website: devco.org

New Brunswick Development Corporation (DEVCO) is a 501(c)(3) non-profit urban real estate development organization created in the mid-1970s to initiate redevelopment projects and to serve as the vehicle for public and private investment in the City of New Brunswick and other New Jersey urban communities. Since its inception, Devco has overseen more than $3 billion in investment to aid in economic revitalization in New Brunswick as well as redevelopment projects in Atlantic City, Newark, and Paterson.

== History ==
New Brunswick Development Corporation was founded as a nonprofit, tax-exempt redevelopment corporation by Richard B. Sellars, a former executive at Johnson & Johnson, in the late 1970s. The corporation's mission at the time was to act as a catalyst for public and private investment to spur economic development and revitalization efforts in the City. Its first major project was a $6 million renovation of a Hyatt Regency Hotel, which was backed Johnson & Johnson.

Since its foundation, the corporation has been associated with Middlesex County politicians and government officials including Mayor James M. Cahill, former Mayor and State Senator John A. Lynch Jr. and Chairman of New Brunswick Development Corporation George Zoffinger.

== Projects ==
- Rutgers Cancer Institute of New Jersey
- Blanquita Valenti Elementary School
- Stockton Island Campus, Atlantic City
- National Park Service Visitor Center, City of Paterson
- New Brunswick Performing Arts Center Redevelopment
- Rutgers College Avenue Campus Redevelopment
- Wellness Plaza
- Gateway Transit Village/The Vue
- The Heldrich Redevelopment Project
- New Brunswick High School
- Rockoff Hall Student Apartment
- Rutgers Liberty Plaza
- New Brunswick Performing Arts Center
