= Thomas Murphy (broadcasting) =

American broadcast executive (1925–2022)

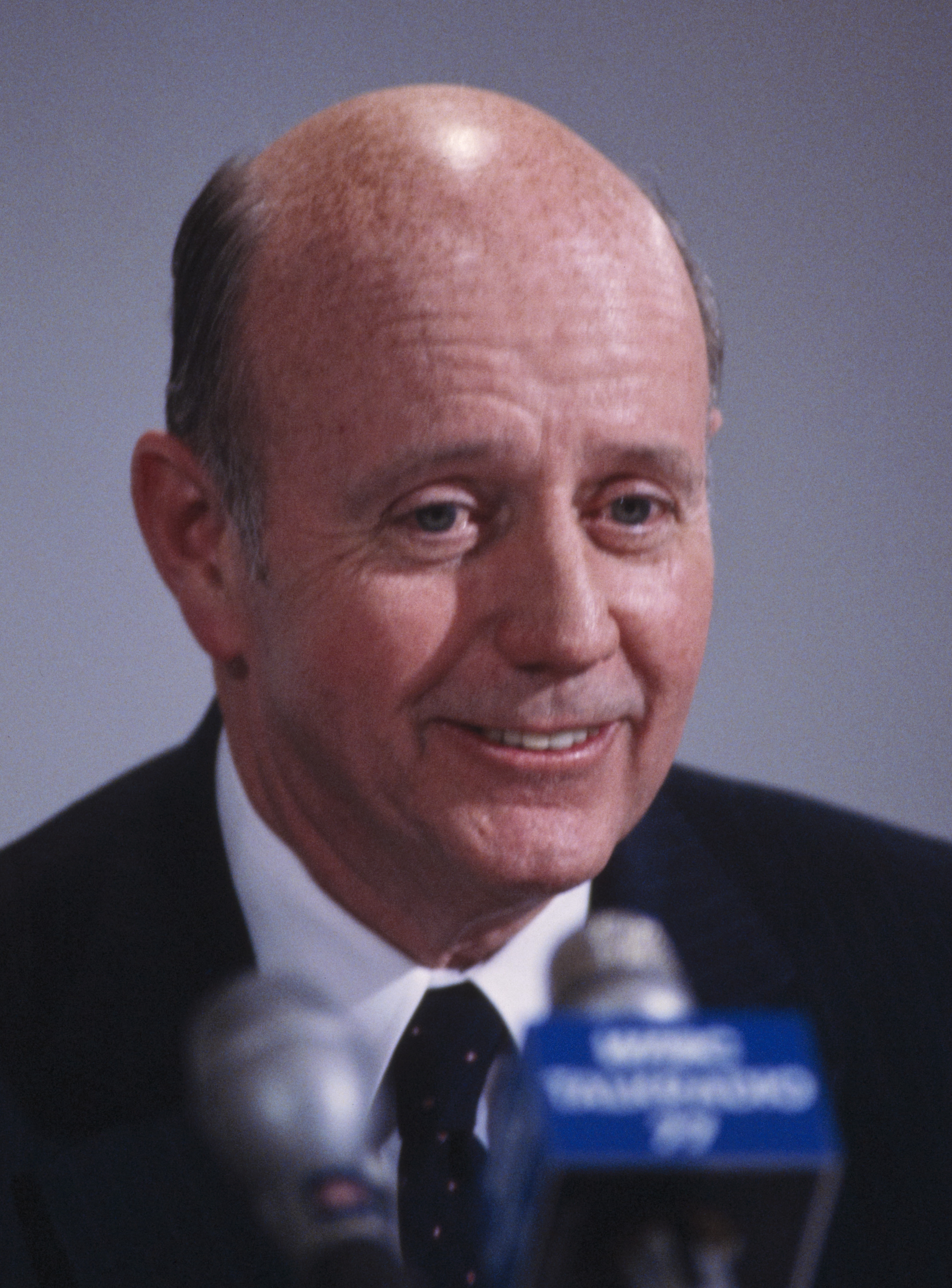
- Murphy in 1985
- Born: May 31, 1925; Brooklyn, New York City, U.S.
- Died: May 25, 2022 (aged 96); Rye, New York, U.S.
- Education: Princeton University; Cornell University (BS); Harvard University (MBA)
- Occupation: Broadcasting executive
- Spouse: Suzanne Murphy (died 2009)
- Children: 4

Thomas Sawyer Murphy (May 31, 1925 – May 25, 2022) was an American broadcasting executive, and was chair and chief executive officer of Capital Cities / ABC, Inc. until 1996. Together with fellow Capital Cities executive Daniel Burke, Murphy engineered the acquisition of the American Broadcasting Company in 1986 for $3.5 billion. Murphy and Burke, who served as president and chief executive of ABC until 1994, are credited with increasing the profitability and efficiency of ABC.

== Early life and education ==
Murphy was born in Brooklyn on May 31, 1925. His father, Charles, was a lawyer involved in Democratic Party politics and later worked as a judge in the Judiciary of New York; his mother, Elizabeth (Sawyer), was a homemaker. Murphy initially studied at Princeton University, before enlisting in the US Navy and serving from 1943 to 1946. He then studied mechanical engineering at Cornell University, graduating with a Bachelor of Science in 1945. After his application to Harvard Business School was rejected, he was employed by Texaco as an oil salesman for a year. He was later accepted by Harvard and obtained a Master of Business Administration in 1949, graduating as a Baker Scholar.

== Career ==
Murphy first worked at Kenyon & Eckhardt as an account executive, before becoming a brand manager for Lever Brothers. His fortunes changed when broadcaster and author Lowell Thomas, and his business manager/partner, Frank Smith, led a New York City-based investor group to buy control of Albany, New York-based Hudson Valley Broadcasting Company, in 1954 and hired Murphy to run the WROW stations as their new general manager. Although Murphy did not have any broadcast experience, his leadership and conservative financial restraint helped bring WROW-TV (now WTEN) to profitability three years later. In December 1957, Hudson Valley merged with Durham Television Enterprises, owners of WTVD in Durham, North Carolina, to form Capital Cities Television Corporation, which later became Capital Cities Broadcasting Corp. in 1960 and Capital Cities Communications thirteen years later.

Murphy moved up quickly in the ranks of the company. He became Capital Cities' first vice president in 1960. Four years later, he was promoted to president while Smith moved up to become the company's first chairman. After Smith's unexpected death in 1966, Murphy became chairman and chief executive officer, a position that he held for the next 30 years. Under his leadership, he helped build Capital Cities from a small broadcasting company into a multibillion-dollar media conglomerate. He then got into the publishing and newspaper business by buying Fairchild Publications in 1968, and then bought several newspapers including The Kansas City Star and Fort Worth Star-Telegram. Murphy's biggest acquisition came in 1985 when he bought the American Broadcasting Company for $3.5 billion to form Capital Cities/ABC. The merger was engineered by Murphy and the man who replaced him as WTEN's station manager, Daniel B. Burke, who became ABC's president. In 1995 Capital Cities / ABC was bought by Disney. He was a member of the board of directors of Berkshire Hathaway, General Housewares Corp., Texaco, Inc., Johnson & Johnson, and IBM Corporation and a life trustee and honorary vice chair of New York University.

== Personal life and death ==
Murphy was married to Suzanne Crosby Murphy until her death in 2009. Together, they had four children: Emilie, Thomas Jr., Kathleen, and Mary. Murphy died on May 25, 2022, at his home in Rye, New York.

== Awards ==
- Television Hall of Fame
- 1996 NATPE Lifetime Achievement Award

== General and cited sources ==
- "Thomas S. Murphy", Encyclopedia of television, Editor Horace Newcomb, CRC Press, 2004, ISBN 978-1-57958-411-5
- Forbes, Malcolm S. "Mighty CEOs Who are Also All-round Nice Guys are Rare." Forbes (New York), December 11, 1989.
- Gibbs, Nancy. "Easy as ABC." Time (New York), August 14, 1995.
- Hawver, W. Capital Cities/ABC The Early Years: 1954-1986 How the Minnow Came to Swallow The Whale. Radnor, Pennsylvania: Chilton, 1994.
- Ländler, Mark. "Creators of the Big Deal, Capital Cities' Tandem Team." The New York Times, August 1, 1995.
- Roberts, Johnnie L. "The Men Behind the Big Megadeals." Newsweek (New York), August 14, 1995.
