= Daniel Burke (executive) =

American television executive

- Born: February 4, 1929; Albany, New York, U.S.
- Died: October 26, 2011 (aged 82); Rye, New York, U.S.
- Education: University of Vermont; Harvard University
- Children: Steve (son)
- Relatives: James E. Burke (brother)

Daniel Burke (February 4, 1929 – October 26, 2011) was an American television executive.

== Biography ==
Originally from Albany, New York, Burke served in the Korean War, later earning his bachelor's degree from the University of Vermont and his MBA from Harvard Business School. He worked for General Foods in Albany for five years after leaving Harvard before joining Capital Cities. In 2011, the Los Angeles Times called Burke one of the "architects of the modern television industry."

=== Acquisition of the American Broadcasting Company ===
With Capital Cities Chairman Tom Murphy, Burke spearheaded the $3.5 billion acquisition of the American Broadcasting Company in 1986 by Capital Cities, a much smaller company. Burke became President of ABC following the merger, running the daily operations of the television network until his retirement in 1994. Burke and Murphy streamlined ABC's operations and made the network more profitable. One of Burke's three sons, Steve, former head of Comcast, has headed NBCUniversal since 2010.

=== Philanthropy ===
His philanthropic efforts included serving as Chairman Emeritus of NewYork–Presbyterian Hospital and as director of Partnership for a Drug-Free America. He founded a minor league baseball team based in Portland, Maine.

=== Death ===
Daniel Burke died at aged 82 from complications of diabetes at his home in Rye, New York, on October 26, 2011.

=== Awards and honors ===
- 1984: Ida B. Wells Award by the National Association of Black Journalists
- 1992: Golden Plate Award of the American Academy of Achievement
- 2008: Television Academy Hall of Fame
