= Robert Wood Johnson I =

American businessman (1845–1910)

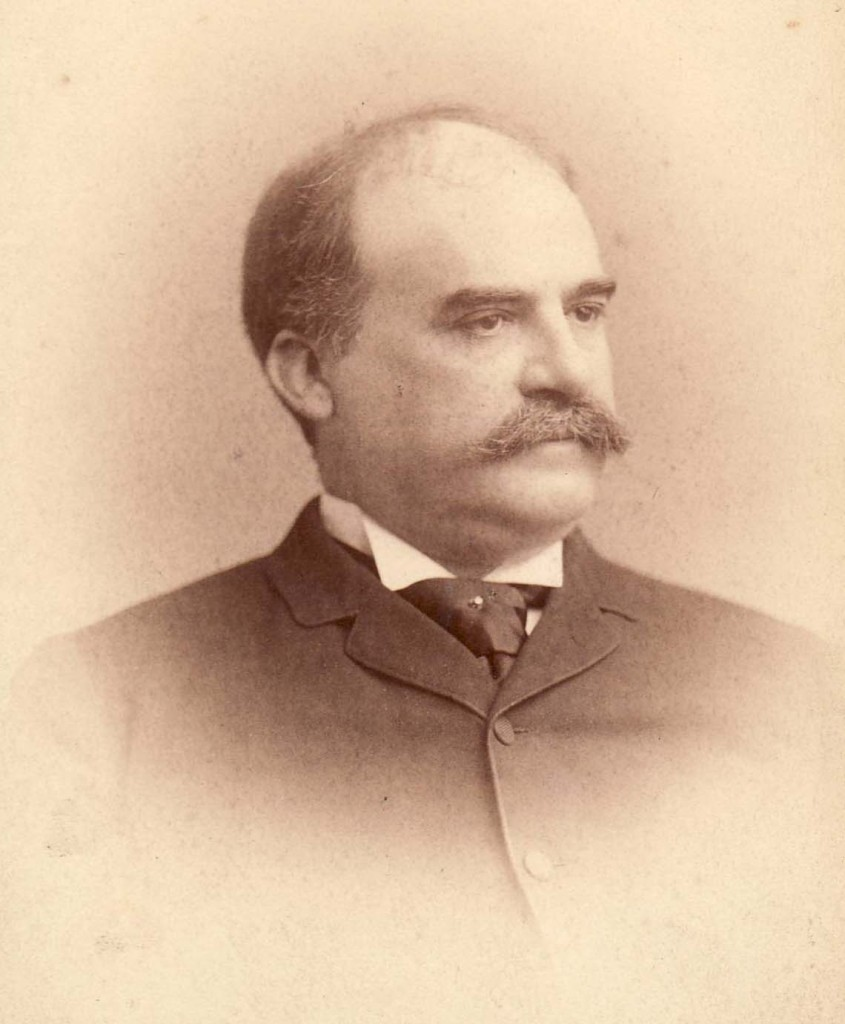
- Born: Robert Wood Johnson; February 20, 1845; Carbondale, Pennsylvania, U.S.
- Died: February 7, 1910 (aged 64); New Brunswick, New Jersey, U.S.
- Occupation: Founder of Johnson & Johnson
- Spouse(s): Ellen Cutler (m. 1880–?); Evangeline Brewster Armstrong
- Children: Roberta Johnson; John Seward Johnson I (1895–1983); Robert Wood Johnson II (1893–1968); Evangeline Johnson Merrill (1897–1990)

Robert Wood Johnson I (February 20, 1845 – February 7, 1910) was an American industrialist. He was one of the three brothers who founded Johnson & Johnson.

== Early life and education ==
Johnson was born in Carbondale, Pennsylvania, on February 15, 1845. His father was Sylvester Johnson III, and his mother was Frances Louisa Wood. Johnson grew up with two siblings, James Wood Johnson and Edward Mead Johnson.

Johnson was educated in the public schools of Carbondale and at Wyoming Seminary in Kingston, Pennsylvania. The family belonged to an Episcopal church.

== Career ==
In 1861, Johnson accepted an apprenticeship in Poughkeepsie, New York from his uncle James Wood to work for the apothecary of Wood & Tittmer. This was to become his training for a lifelong career. He later left Wood & Tittmer in 1864, to work in New York City for Roushton & Aspinwall.

=== Lister ===
While working for Rouston & Aspinwall, Johnson met George J. Seabury. He and Seabury eventually left the firm and entered a business partnership, Seabury & Johnson. Both men had an interest in Joseph Lister's discovery of the implications of sterile surgery. They aimed to make products that would assist in operating rooms. Johnson worked 12-hour days working towards invention of aseptic surgical equipment. By 1878, the firm was making $10,000 a month (equivalent to $325,828 in 2024)

Seabury and Johnson disagreed on the distribution of the firm's profits. Seabury disapproved of having Johnson's brother, James Wood Johnson, in the firm. In 1880, Johnson sold his shares to Seabury, and agreed to abstain from the medical business for ten years.

=== Johnson & Johnson ===
Meanwhile, James Wood Johnson and Edward Mead Johnson started Johnson & Johnson, which was initially a family business. The company struggled to remain profitable, and had insufficient capital for a startup company. While the two brothers were proceeding alone, Seabury was unable to pay RWJ the monthly payments that had been agreed upon when Johnson departed the partnership. Seabury agreed to let Johnson re-enter the medical industry if Seabury could cease making the monthly payments. Johnson agreed, and joined his brothers' firm, providing the capital for a fresh start.

The new partnership gave Johnson half of the company's shares in return for management of the company. His brothers received 30% of the company. Johnson commuted between the factory in New Brunswick, New Jersey, and the office in New York. By early 1888, Johnson & Johnson was making $25,000 a month (equivalent to $874,907 in 2024).

=== Kilmer ===
Frederick Barnett Kilmer owned a pharmacy in New Brunswick, New Jersey. Johnson met Kilmer in early 1887, and developed a lifelong friendship. After meeting Johnson, Kilmer became more involved in Johnson & Johnson. He eventually became an employee and introduced one of the first medical research laboratories.

Kilmer was responsible for making many of the innovations in sterilized dressings. The first marketing items Kilmer introduced were medical manuals; guides for how to react when injured aboard trains, such as when feet are crushed or when legs are broken.

Later, Kilmer influenced most of America with his new products. By the late 19th century, railroads had covered most of the nation. Americans were traveling more and farther than ever before. To address the medical needs of travelers, Kilmer introduced first-aid kits. The Red Cross symbol became as well known. Soon, people believed that the first-aid kits were as important to them as railroads and light bulbs. It became an American way of life to grab a first-aid kit when in need of help.

In 1890, Kilmer received a letter from a colleague seeking advice on treating skin irritation on one of his patients. The patient had used medicated plasters and it was assumed that the plaster caused the irritation. Kilmer sent him a small tin of Italian talc. With the success of this treatment, Johnson & Johnson started including containers of talc with its plasters.

== Personal life ==
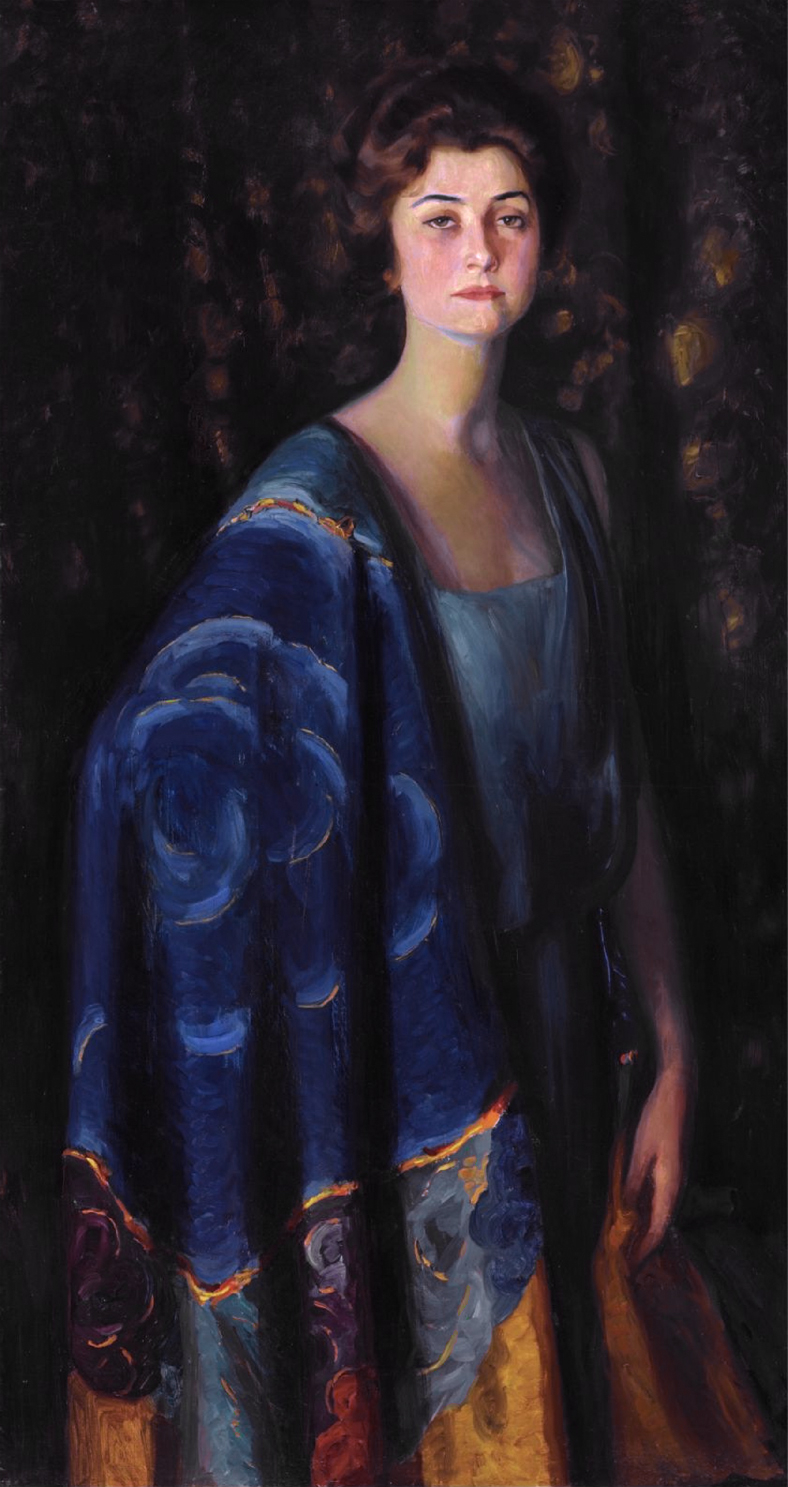
Johnson's second wife, Evangeline Brewster Johnson, in 1922

In 1880, Johnson married Ellen Cutler. They had one child: Roberta Johnson.

Johnson later married Evangeline Brewster Armstrong. They had three children: John Seward Johnson I, Robert Wood Johnson II, and Evangeline Johnson. His daughter Evangeline married composer Leopold Stokowski by whom she had two children.

On February 7, 1910, Johnson died of Bright's disease in New Brunswick, New Jersey, at the age of 64.

== See also ==
- Robert Wood Johnson Foundation

Business positions
Preceded by N/A	President of Johnson & Johnson; 1886–1910	Succeeded by James Wood Johnson
