= James Wood Johnson =

American businessman; Johnson & Johnson co-founder

- Born: March 17, 1856; Pennsylvania, U.S.
- Died: September 1932 (aged 76); Atlantic Ocean
- Occupation: Businessman
- Known for: Co-founder of pharmaceutical company Johnson & Johnson
- Family: Robert Wood Johnson (brother); Edward Mead Johnson (brother)

James Wood Johnson (March 17, 1856 – September 1932) was an American businessman and one of the co-founders of Johnson & Johnson. In 1886, James Wood Johnson and his two brothers Robert Wood Johnson I and Edward Mead Johnson founded Johnson & Johnson in New Brunswick, New Jersey.

He died in September 1932 onboard RMS Majestic in the mid-Atlantic Ocean while returning from holiday in Britain to the United States.
