= Robert Wood Johnson II =

American politician

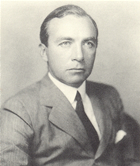

Mayor of Highland Park, New Jersey
- In office 1920–1922

Personal details
- Born: April 4, 1893 New Brunswick, New Jersey, U.S.
- Died: January 30, 1968 (aged 74) New York City, U.S.
- Spouses: Elizabeth Dixon Ross (m. 1916; div. 1928) Margaret Shea (m. 1930; div. 1943) Evelyn Paynter (m. 1944)
- Children: 2, including Robert Wood Johnson III
- Parent(s): Robert Wood Johnson I Evangeline Brewster Armstrong

Military service
- Allegiance: United States
- Branch/service: United States Army
- Years of service: 1926–43
- Rank: Brigadier general
- Battles/wars: World War II

Robert Wood "General" Johnson II (April 4, 1893 – January 30, 1968) was an American businessman. He was one of the sons of Robert Wood Johnson I, the co-founder of Johnson & Johnson. He turned the family business into one of the world's largest healthcare corporations.

== Early life ==
Johnson was born in New Brunswick, New Jersey, on April 4, 1893. His father was Robert Wood Johnson I, co-founder of Johnson & Johnson, and his mother was Evangeline Brewster Armstrong Johnson. Johnson grew up with three siblings: Roberta Johnson, John Seward Johnson I, and Evangeline Johnson. When he was sixteen, their father died, leaving him an estate of $2,000,000 (equivalent to $71,666,667 in 2025). He attended Rutgers Preparatory School before dropping out to start working full-time at Johnson & Johnson.

== Career ==
Johnson became vice president at J&J in 1918. Johnson also had an abiding interest in politics, and served a term as the mayor of Highland Park, New Jersey from 1920 to 1922. He was elected president of Johnson & Johnson from 1932 to 1938, and became chairman of the board of J&J in 1938. Johnson also held a reserve commission in the U.S. Army Quartermaster Corps during the 1930s. At the outbreak of World War II, Johnson's work in identifying products needed by the war effort resulted in the Permacell division of J&J inventing duct tape for sealing ammunition boxes. J&J plant managers simply took their existing cloth medical adhesive tape, added a waterproof plastic layer with a more aggressive adhesive, and produced it in olive drab (OD) green to match the ammunition cans. During the war, J&J would become a major supplier for combat first aid kits and other military supplies. In 1941, Johnson started the Ethicon subsidiary.

In 1942, Johnson's reserve Army commission was activated, and he was promoted to the rank of brigadier general and assigned to the Ordnance Department. That same year he was nominated by the Roosevelt administration to be vice-chairman of the board of the War Plants Corporation (WPC). When the Smaller War Plants Corporation (SWPC) was established as a division of the WPC in June 1942, Johnson was named chairman of the board of the SWPC., which regulated wartime production of military goods and defense items in smaller defense plants and businesses (500 or fewer employees) dispersed throughout the U.S. economy. The SWPC made direct loans, encouraged commercial lenders to make credit available to small businesses, and advocated for small businesses with federal agencies and larger corporate enterprises.

During his tenure as chairman of the SWPC, Johnson personally oversaw war contracts assigned to more than 6,000 companies. His tenure was a troubled one, and was marked by complaints from small businesses that they were not being awarded a significant portion of the most valuable wartime defense contracts. During 1943, firms with under 100 employees were awarded 86,000 contracts, about 35% of the total number awarded (241,531), but worth only 3.5% of the total value ($35.3 million) of all contracts awarded by the SWPC. Johnson responded by increasing the number of contracts to small businesses; however, instead of examining each company to determine what contribution each could make to the war effort, the SWPC began distributing contracts as a form of relief to prevent setbacks to small concerns with unused factory plant capacity.

As chairman of the SWPC and an Army general in the Ordnance Branch, Johnson had a tendency to overrule service branch requests for approval for production of specific military armament and ordnance items in favor of competing but less capable designs that could be made more rapidly or with lower material costs, freeing scarce but non-critical materials to small companies so that they could begin the transition to peacetime goods production. This infuriated Johnson's military superiors in the War Department, who realized that the diversion of materials to peacetime production meant less factory capacity for new weapons and increased production of war materiel just as victory seemed to be within the grasp of Allied forces. Unfazed, Johnson lost no opportunity in annoying his military superiors, frequently citing his business experience in support of his decisions.

Matters came to a head in the fall of 1943, when the entire Michigan regional division of the SWPC resigned in protest over the actions of the parent board, stating that the SWPC was "nothing more than a glorified publicity agency". Thomas W. Moss, regional director, announced in a press release that the resignations of the entire Michigan regional division board were included in a resolution sent to Johnson on September 29, 1943. Two days later, on October 1, 1943, Johnson resigned his chairmanship of the SWPC, citing ill health as the reason for his sudden departure.

Johnson returned to his chairmanship at J&J in 1943. He was responsible for writing the Johnson & Johnson Credo, a statement of business principles which is carved into the wall of the company's New Jersey headquarters. The Credo states that the company's first responsibility is to “the doctors, nurses and patients, the mothers and all others who use our products”, and also sets out responsibilities to customers, suppliers, distributors, employees, communities and stockholders.

In 1962, Johnson, as chairman of the board of J&J, fired his nephew, John Seward Johnson II. In 1965, he fired his own son, Robert Wood Johnson III.

== Personal life ==
In 1916, Johnson married Elizabeth Dixon Ross. They had one child: Robert Wood Johnson III. Their marriage lasted until 1928, when they began a two-year trial separation, ending in divorce. In 1930, Johnson married Margaret (Maggi) Shea. They had one adopted child, Sheila Johnson Brutsch (born 1934). The couple divorced in 1943 after Bob met Evelyn Vernon.

In 1944, Johnson married Evelyn Vernon (née Paynter), a former ballet dancer and a dance instructor who, like Johnson, was married when they met.

In 1928, Johnson had taken up residence at Morven in Princeton, New Jersey, the historic home of the Stockton family. It was converted into the New Jersey Governor's mansion after Johnson's lease on the property ended in 1945.

Johnson died in 1968 at Roosevelt Hospital in New York City; he left the bulk of his $400,000,000 estate to the Robert Wood Johnson Foundation. Johnson was buried at Elmwood Cemetery in North Brunswick, New Jersey.

== Recognition ==
In 2008, Johnson was inducted into the New Jersey Hall of Fame.

Business positions
Preceded by James Wood Johnson	President of Johnson & Johnson; 1910–1961	Succeeded by Robert Wood Johnson III
