= League of Christian Employers =

Flemish Christian employers organization

The League of Christian Employers (Dutch: Verbond van Kristelijke Werkgevers, VKW) is a Flemish Christian employers organization. Herman Van de Velde is the president of the organization.

== Notable members ==
- François-Xavier van der Straten-Waillet (director of VKW)
- Léon Bekaert (1891–1961), Bekaert
- Jan Callewaert (CEO Option)
- Jef Colruyt (Colruyt N.V.)

== See also ==
- Agoria
- European Association of Craft, Small and Medium-Sized Enterprises (UEAPME)
- Federation of Belgian Enterprises
- UNIAPAC
- UNIZO
- VOKA
- Walloon Union of Companies
