= Pieter Timmermans =

Belgian businessman (born 1964)

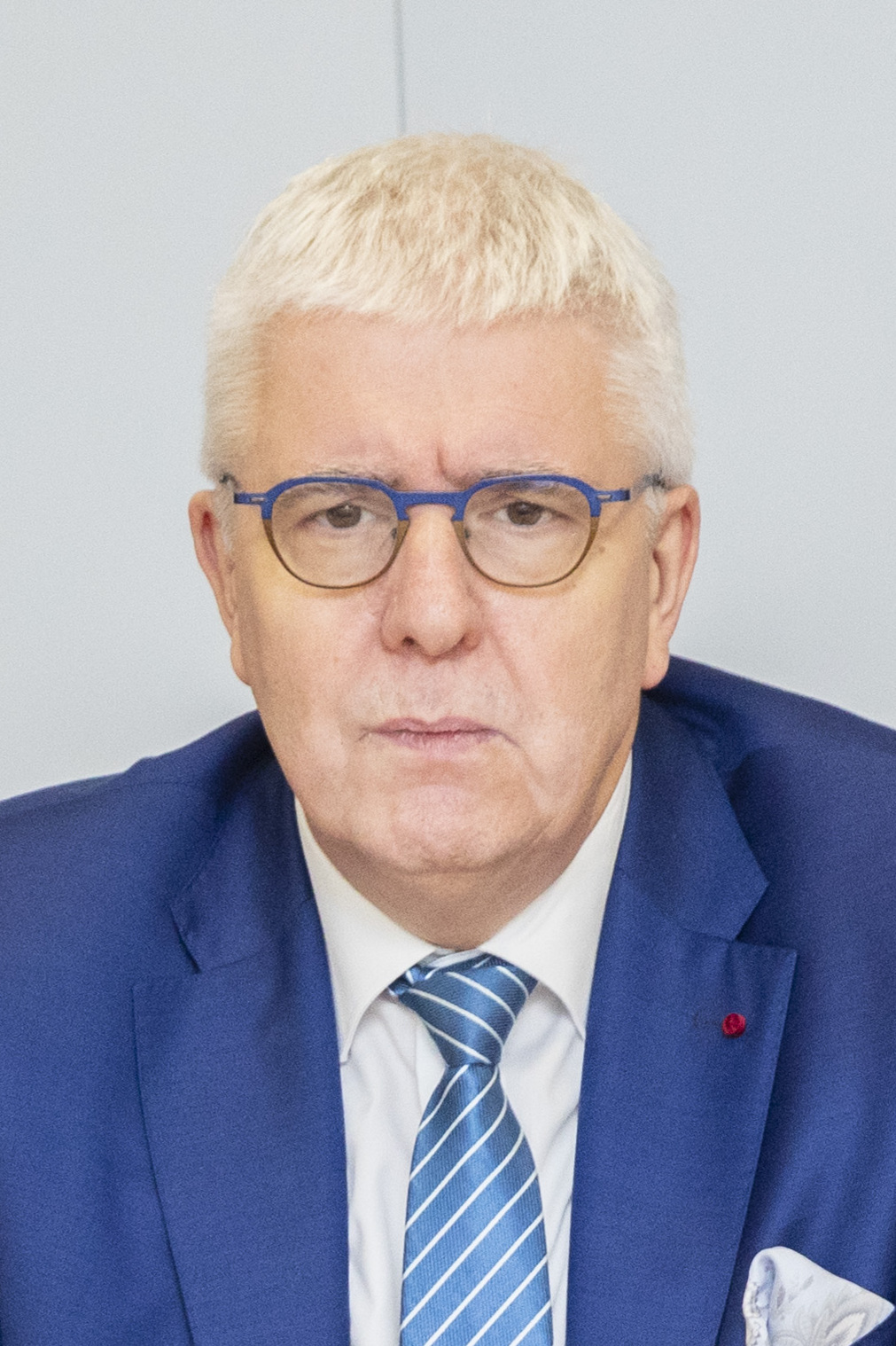
- Timmermans in 2025
- Born: June 14, 1964 (age 62); Ninove, Belgium
- Education: KU Leuven; Hogeschool-Universiteit Brussel; Stanford Graduate School of Business
- Occupation: Businessman
- Title: Director General at Federation of Belgian Enterprises (2012–)
- Predecessor: Rudi Thomaes
- Spouse: Christel Timmermans
- Children: 2

Pieter, Baron Timmermans (born 14 June 1964 in Ninove) is a Belgian businessman. He has been the Chief executive officer of the Federation of Belgian Enterprises (VBO) since July 2012 and a member of the Group of Ten.

== Education ==
He obtained a master's degree in Business Engineering from KU Leuven in 1986 and Public Administration from Hogeschool-Universiteit Brussel (now part of KU Leuven) in 1993. In 2011, he completed an Executive Program at the Graduate School of Business at Stanford University.

== Career ==
He first held a position as an assistant in the Department of Applied Economic Sciences in KU Leuven and at the research department of the Ministry of Economic Affairs. In 1993, he worked as the socio-economic advisor to the then Minister of Budget and Deputy Prime Minister Herman Van Rompuy while also working as a lecturer of public finance at VLEKHO (once part of the Hogeschool-Universiteit Brussel) from 1994 to 2007. In 1998, he joined the Federation of Belgian Enterprises as director general and was responsible for socio-economic dossiers and social dialogue.

Since May 2012, Pieter Timmermans has been the CEO of the Federation of Belgian Enterprises, succeeding Rudi Thomaes. Since 27 May 2013, he has served as a regent of the National Bank of Belgium.

In addition to his duties at the VBO, Timmermans is a member of the executive committee of the Confederation of European Business, a visiting professor at KU Leuven, Vice-chairman of the National Labour Council, Vice-chairman of the Central Business Council, and a member of the Board of Directors of BMR, the Prince Albert Fund, and the Foreign Trade Agency.

Timmermans has said to be a key figure of Belgian social dialogue, having social agreements to the then ACV chairman Luc Cortebeeck. After Cortebeeck's retirement, Timmermans became a senior member of the Group of Ten, the top negotiators for trade unions and employers.

In 2018, King Philippe of Belgium bestowed Timmermans the title of baron.

== Personal life ==
Timmermans said to have met his wife through his sister, who was also studying business engineering at the time. They had two children together.

Timmermans is said to be a fan of the RSC Anderlechts.
