= Belgacom Fund =

Belgian foundation

The Belgacom Fund, is a Belgian fund created within the King Baudouin Foundation in 1999 for a period of three years, which promotes dialogue between citizens and local authorities. The fund provided financial support to either local authorities or those of Social Services in Wallonia, Flanders, and in Brussels (region) that improve the dialogue between the Belgian citizen and local authorities.

== See also ==
- Belgacom
- Prince Albert Fund
- Prince Philippe Fund
