= Union of Self-Employed Entrepreneurs =

Logo

UNIZO (Dutch: Unie van Zelfstandige Ondernemers) is a Belgian association of entrepreneurs, Small and Medium Sized Enterprises (SME); it is mainly situated in the Flemish region of the Kingdom of Belgium.

The Union of Independent Entrepreneurs (UNIZO) is a Belgian association of entrepreneurs, small and medium-sized enterprises and liberal professions. With over 80,000 members, it is the largest association of its kind and is mainly located in the Flemish Region. The association is represented in the National Labour Council and in the Social and Economic Council of Flanders. Bart Buysse has been the managing director since 15 September 2025.

== Publication ==
UNIZO publishes the magazine, UNIZOmagazine. The magazine is intended for small and medium-sized enterprises. Sold commercially in Belgium, it has a run of 86,844 copies. It is the largest review in Belgium for this target group.

== See also ==
- Agoria
- Brussels Enterprises Commerce and Industry (BECI)
- Economy of Belgium
- European Association of Craft, Small and Medium-Sized Enterprises (UEAPME)
- Federation of Belgian Enterprises
- VKW
- National Federation of Independent Business (USA)
- VOKA
- Walloon Union of Companies
