= Inge Geerdens =

Flemish business executive

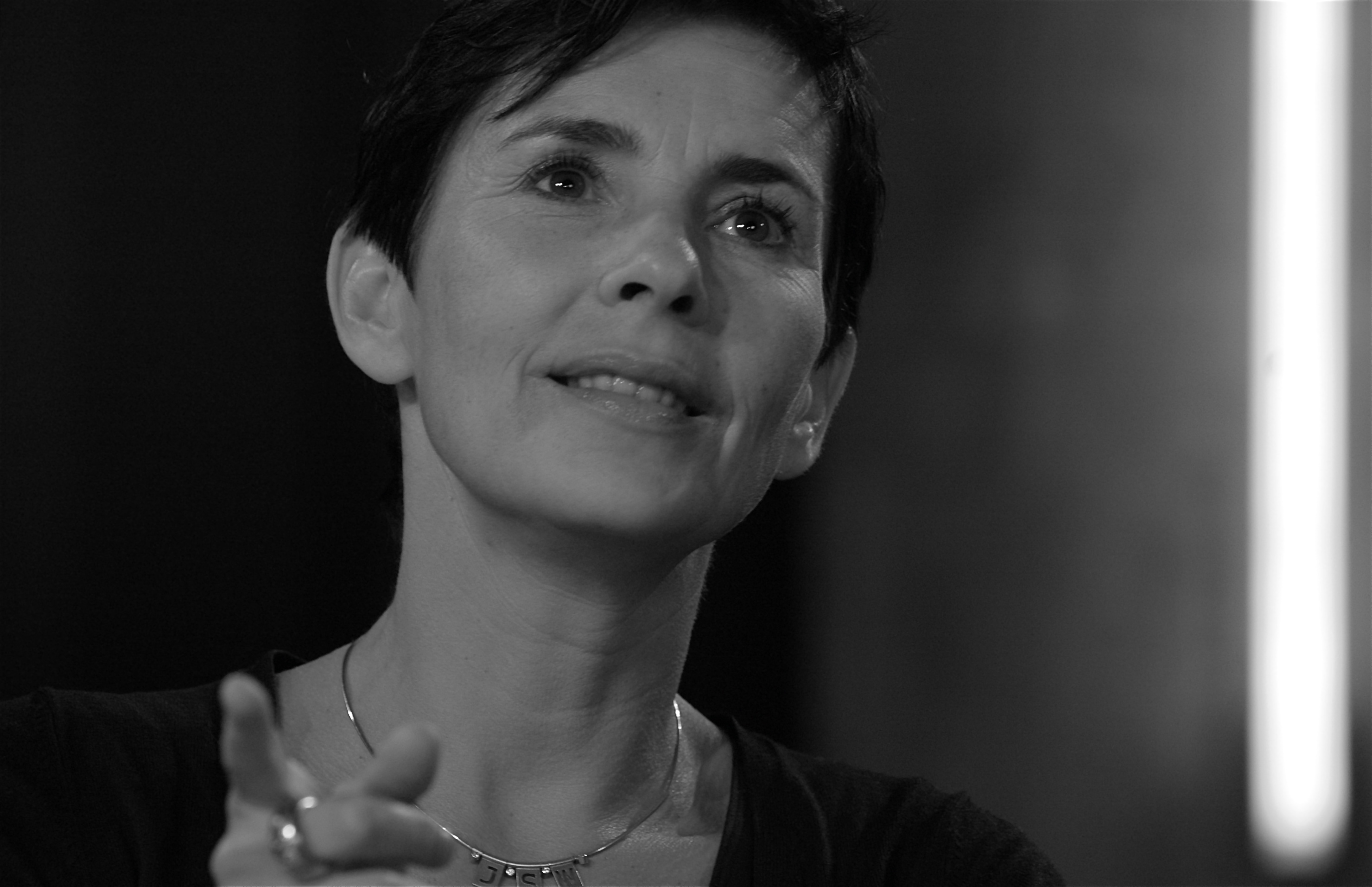
- Inge Geerdens, c. June 2012 (by Dieter Dedecker)
- Born: Inge Geerdens; 15 September 1970 (age 54)
- Occupation(s): Founder and CEO of CVWarehouse
- Years active: 1993–present

Inge Geerdens (born 15 September 1970) is a Flemish businesswoman, entrepreneur and founder and CEO of CVWarehouse.

== Education ==
She has a MA in Applied Linguistics, Interpreting and Translation (1992, Lessius Hogeschool), a Master in International Politics (1993, University of Antwerp) and received a degree in KMO Excellence (2007, Vlerick Management School)

== Career ==
In 1993, Geerdens started her career in Brussels at the accounting department of Peek & Cloppenburg. In 1994, Geerders became a researcher at Milar. In 1996, Geerdens left to become an independent researcher, helping international headhunters identify the right people to approach. In 1998, Geerdens founded Inge Geerdens sprl.

In 2003, Geerdens created her first company Executive Research. This recruitment company charges a price per day rather than a percentage of a yearly salary. In November 2008, Executive Research was sold to Acerta, a major Belgian HR Service Provider.

In 2004, Geerdens created CVWarehouse, a spin-off of Executive Research. It is an e-recruitment web-based product that combines a jobsite, CV database and an Applicant Tracking System, and is designed to be used by HR professionals. In 2006, CVWarehouse was created as a separate company and was launched on the Belgian market.

In 2007, Geerdens (alongside of Jan Callewaert and Gabriël Fehervari) founded Your Next Move, company that promotes entrepreneurship through chess in primary schools with the support of chess grandmaster Garry Kasparov.

=== Other work ===
- Presenter at E-unlimited (2006 – 2007)
- Ambassadress at Bryo (January 2006 – 2016)
- Director at VKW (2009 – August 2011)
- Member of the Board at Bizidee (September 2009 – August 2012)
- Member of the Advisory Board at PNV Elektrotechniek (2010 – June 2011)
- Member of the Advisory Board at Autoglass Clinic (January 2010 – 2019)
- Co-founder of Your Job Expo (March 2010 – May 2010)
- Member of the Board at La Bottega (March 2012 – present)
- Advisor at Econopolis (January 2013 – present)

== Publications ==
Geerdens has contributed to several published works such as the non-fiction book Wake up Belgians! to which also Belgian liberal politician Herman De Croo and Belgian economist and politician Mark Eyskens contributed

Furthermore, Geerdens is also an active columnist for:

- the Flemish newspaper De Tijd and its French counterpart L'Echo
- the KMO/PME magazine which is a business magazine for small businesses
- the Z.O. magazine which is published by Unizo
- the Trends magazine which is a financial economic magazine published by Knack

== Honors and awards ==
- WOMED award (2005) that celebrates the best female entrepreneur of the year, which is handed out by Unizo and Vlerick Management School
- De Blauwe Kei (2006) which is an award that's handed out by the Flemish liberal political party VLD
- the price for best Entrepreneurial Idea (2006), handed out by the Flanders Business School & Adecco
- Award for best Elevator Pitch (2006) at the European Venture Contest
- Price for Most Promising Company with International Scope (2010), handed out by Unizo
- In 2012, Geerdens became a Thought Leader on LinkedIn.
