= Prince Philippe Fund =

Belgian foundation

The Prince Philippe Fund is a Belgian foundation, which wants to contribute and maintain the dialogue between the different communities of Belgium (Brussels, Flanders, Wallonia). The fund was founded in 1998, as an initiative of Crown Prince Philippe of Belgium, and it operates within the framework of the King Baudouin Foundation. In order to improve the dialogues between the Belgian communities it supports exchanges, meetings and a dialogue between groups of citizens from all three communities in order to stimulate greater mutual recognition, which transcends linguistic barriers (French in Wallonia, Dutch in Flanders, French and Dutch in Brussels, German in the east of Wallonia). The foundation wants to create a climate of respect for the specific features and cultures of all Belgian communities.

== Projects ==
Currently the Fund supports four projects:

1. Trèfle (Intercommunity exchanges for primary and secondary education)
2. Trialogue (Intercommunity exchanges between students in non-university higher education).
3. Trois + (Inter-community exchanges in the non-market sector)
4. Exchange of journalists

== See also ==
- Prince Albert Fund
- Belgacom Fund

== Sources ==
- Prince Philippe Fund
