= WTCM =

WTCM may refer to:

- WTCM (AM), a radio station (580 AM) licensed to Traverse City, Michigan, United States
- WTCM-FM, a radio station (103.5 FM) licensed to Traverse City, Michigan, United States
- SIRRIS, knowledge centre for the technology industry in Belgium, formerly known as CRIF-WTCM
