= Christ'l Joris =

Belgian businesswoman

Christ'l Joris (born Antwerp, Belgium, 17 July 1954) is a Belgian businesswoman. She is the President of the Board of ETAP Lighting, president of Agoria Flanders and of Flanders Investment and Trade. Christ'l Joris is a daughter of Norbert Joris, founder of the ETAP group of companies.

Christ'l Joris obtained a master's degree in psychology and a PhD in social and cultural anthropology at the Katholieke Universiteit Leuven (Leuven).

She started her career in Academia and the non-profit sector in mental healthcare. She also worked for the King Baudouin Foundation on programs for environmental care and economics. In 1994 she joined ETAP Lighting, and in 2005 she became president of Flanders Investment and Trade (FIT). She is president of Rode Kruis-Vlaanderen.
