= Julien De Wilde =

Belgian businessman

Baron De Wilde (Julien) (b. Wetteren, 7 January 1944) is a former Belgian business executive and board member who played a key role in the manufacturing and technology sector. He was Chairman of Nyrstar and Agfa-Gevaert, and member of the boards of Bekaert and Telenet. He is honorary Chairman of the Prince Albert Fund and honorary chairman of Agoria. He was admitted to the hereditary nobility with the title of baron by H.M. King Albert II in 2012.

== Education ==
He graduated as Master of Science in Chemical Engineering at the Katholieke Universiteit Leuven (Leuven) in 1967.

== Career ==
In 1969, he started his career as an engineer at Texaco Belgium (1969–1972). He was head of technical product management for Texaco Europe from 1972 until 1977. From 1977 until 1983, he was manager information systems for Texaco Belgium, the Netherlands and France. From 1983 until 1986, he was a member of the board of directors of Texaco Belgium, and from 1986 until 1988 Texaco Europe. From 1988 until 1989, he was head of the research and business development centre of Recticel, Belgium. From 1993 until 1994, Julien De Wilde was General manager of Alcatel Bell, from 1996 until 1999 CEO of Alcatel Bell and from 1999 until 2002 Executive vice-president of the Alcatel Group. From 2002 until 2006, he was CEO of Bekaert after which he was succeeded by Baron Bert De Graeve.

== Sources ==
- Julien De Wilde (in Dutch)
- Julien De Wilde: Het garantielabel van Nyrstar (in Dutch)
