= Bert De Graeve =

Belgian businessman (born 1955)

- Born: 1955 (age 70–71)
- Education: Sint-Barbaracollege; Ghent University
- Occupation: Businessman

Baron De Graeve (born 1955, Avelgem) is a Belgian businessman. He succeeded Baron Julien De Wilde as chief executive officer (CEO) of Bekaert in 2006, and became chairman of the board in 2014 as successor to Count Paul Buysse until 2019. He is currently Chairman of the Board of Directors of Telenet and Sibelco, and an independent director of UCB. He is a member of the International Business Leaders' Advisory Council for the Mayor of Shanghai (IBLAC). He is also member of the Board of the Concours Reine Elisabeth.

== Education ==
Bert De Grave studied at the Sint-Barbaracollege in Ghent. He graduated as a lawyer from the Ghent University (Ghent) in 1980. In addition, he studied financial management at the IPO-UFSIA Management School (Antwerp) and became Master in Tax Management at VLEKHO (Brussels).

== Career ==
He started his career in 1980 at Arthur Andersen. From 1982 until 1996 he worked for Alcatel Bell. From 1982 until 1991 he worked in various financial responsibilities. From 1991 until 1994 he was General manager Shanghai Bell Telephone Equipm. Mfg. Cy, Shanghai. From 1994 until 1996 he worked in Paris as vice-president, Director Operations, Alcatel Trade international. In 1996 he was Director International Affairs, Alcatel Alsthom in Paris.

From 1996 until 2002, Bert De Graeve was managing director of the Vlaamse Radio- en Televisieomroep (Flemish Public radio and television), after which he was succeeded by Tony Mary.

From 2002 until 2005, he was Bekaert Group executive vice president, chief financial and administration officer and corporate secretary. Since May 2006 he has been chief executive officer (CEO) and in May 2014 he became chairman of Bekaert Group.

== Sources ==
- Kandidaat 4: Bert De Graeve (Bekaert)
- Bert De Graeve nieuwe CEO Bekaert
