= Mieke Offeciers =

Belgian businesswoman (born 1945)

Mieke Offeciers-Van De Wiele (born 12 August 1945 in Kruibeke) is a Belgian businesswoman. From 7 March 1992 to 5 September 1993, she was Belgium's Minister of Budget.

== Biography ==
Mieke Offeciers has a law degree. She started her career at the engineering department of the VEV in 1975. Since 1986, she was head of the study department of the VEV, often lobbying against the shady financial flows between Flanders and Wallonia.

From 7 March 1992 to 5 September 1993, she was Belgium's Minister of Budget for the CVP party. After a tenure of 18 months, she returned to work for the VEV as CEO, succeeding to René De Feyter.

She left the VEV in June 2000 to work for KPMG. Since 2004, she has been working for Interel, a public affairs and strategic communications consulting firm. In 2004, she also set up a small business to renovate and furnish houses.

In 2008, she received a remuneration as board member of Infrabel through a proxy company, bvba MVD Consulting.

== Other roles ==
- Former member of the Coudenberg group, a Belgian federalist think tank.
- Director of the board of Infrabel

== Personal life ==
She is married to Erwin Offeciers, a doctor.
