= ETAP Lighting =

Belgian lighting manufacturer

ETAP Lighting is a Belgian company manufacturing lighting and located in Malle. President of the Board is Christ'l Joris, who is also president of Agoria Flanders and of Flanders Investment and Trade.

== History ==
The company started with the production of ship's lighting in Antwerp in 1949. In 1960 the company moved to Malle in the Flemish Campine region.

Expansion from its traditional domestic Belgian/Dutch market started in the 1970s with France, 1980s into Germany and the 1990s into UK and Portugal. ETAP now also have offices in Spain and partnerships in Sweden and Norway.

ETAP also owns LDI (LED Design Innovation) and Alter.
