= CRIF (disambiguation) =

CRIF is an acronym for the Conseil Représentatif des Institutions juives de France.

CRIF may also refer to:

- CRIF High Mark Credit Information Services, a credit bureau in India
- CRIF, the old name of the knowledge centre for the technology industry in Belgium, now called Sirris
- Closed Reduction with Internal Fixation, a surgical technique for correcting displaced fractures, especially at the hip.
