= Rudi Thomaes =

Belgian businessman (1952–2018)

Rudi, Baron Thomaes (21 August 1952 – 25 July 2018) was a Belgian businessman and CEO of the Federation of Belgian Enterprises and a member of VOKA.

== Education ==
He graduated as a bachelor of law from the University of Antwerp (UFSIA) and obtained a master's degree in law from the University of Antwerp (UIA).

== Career ==
He started his career as a Financial Export Coordinator at Bell Telephone in 1976. He became managing director and Chairman of the Management Committee of Alcatel Bell in 1999. From 1979 until 1981 he was responsible for social, legal and fiscal affairs with ITT Industries in Belgium. In 1981 he returned to Bell Telephone as a contract lawyer until 1983, during this period he negotiated the joint venture and licence contract with China. From 1984 until 1986, he was Assistant Director and Head of the Export Treasury and International Contracts Department at Bell Telephone. From 1986 until 1988 he was Area Manager EMEA and responsible for the marketing of digital switching networks. From 1988 until 1998, he was General Counsel for Alcatel Bell, and responsible for the legal department and the relations with the European Union. In 1997, he became responsible for the strategic change plan of Alcatel Bell. On 1 January 1999, he became Chief Operating Officer and on 1 October 1999 Chief Executive Officer and President of the Alcatel Bell Management Committee

From 2004 to 2012, Rudi Thomaes was CEO of the Federation of Belgian Enterprises and since 29 March 2005 he was a regent of the National Bank of Belgium.

== Sources ==
- Rudi Thomaes (European Business Summit]
- Rudi Thomaes (NBB)
