= Fedustria =

Fedustria is the Belgian non profit federation of the textile, wood and furniture industry. It was founded on 20 December 2006 in Ghent and is the successor of Febeltex and Febelhout. The organization represents a turnover of 12 billion euro employs more than 60,000 people in 2,700 companies in Belgium. Fedustria is also the parent organization of the Belgian Flax and Linen Association.

== Textile companies ==
  - To be expanded
- Associated Weavers
- Beaulieu International Group
- DOMO Group
- Libeco
- Seyntex
- Sioen Industries

== Wood and furniture companies ==
  - To be expanded

== See also ==
- Agoria
- Federation of Belgian Enterprises
- Future Textiles and Clothing (EU)

== Sources ==
- Febeltex en Febelhout fuseren tot Fedustria (Dutch)
- Febeltex en Febelhout fuseren tot Fedustria (Dutch)
