= European Business Summit =

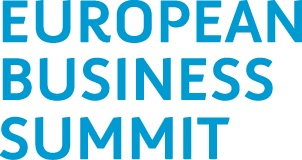
- Emblem
- Formation: 2000
- Location: Brussels, Belgium
- Website: www.ebsummit.eu

European Business Summit (EBS) is an events and conference organiser, and the creator of one of the largest networking and debating events in Brussels – the annual European Business Summit.

== Description ==
EBS was founded in 2000 by the FEB (Federation of Enterprises in Belgium), and later joined in support by BUSINESS EUROPE. From the beginning its purpose was to bring together policy-makers and business leaders to discuss contemporary issues affecting the future of Europe, thus helping to improve the decision-making process on the EU-level.

EBS also organises the “Back from Davos” event, whose purpose is to follow up on the conclusions and achievements of the annual meetings of the World Economic Forum in Davos, Switzerland. The 2018 edition took place on January 30 in Brussels. It took a form of a conversation with Jyrki Katainen – EU Commissioner Jobs, Growth, Investment and Competitiveness and Daniela Vincenti, Editor-in-Chief at EurActiv.

Moreover, EBS supports events such as Think Digital, EU Energy Summit and the European Defence Industry Summit.

When organising its events EBS works with companies, associations, governments and regional representatives, NGOs, academia and think tanks from across multiple sectors.

== Honorary board ==
The Honorary Board of the European Business Summit consists of a number of figures with achievements in the areas of politics and business. Members of the Board include a former Italian Prime Minister Mario Monti, the President of BusinessEurope Emma Marcegaglia and the CEO of the Solvay Group Jean-Pierre Clamadieu among others.

== Partnerships and patronage ==
EBS, under the provision of the Belgian Ministry of Foreign Affairs, is supported by the FEB (Federation of Enterprises in Belgium) and BusinessEurope. EBS also operates under the high patronage of His Majesty the King of the Belgians.

== Annual European Business Summit ==
The European Business Summit (EBS) is the EBS’ annual flagship event organised in Brussels. Each year the Summit attracts more than 2,000 participants and 200 high-level speakers from over 60 countries. Previous guests and speakers include heads of state and government, European ministers, EU Commissioners, high-ranking individuals, civil society, and academia. Since 2014 the Summit has been organized in the Egmont Palace in Brussels, Belgium.

== EBS 2017 ==
The 2017 edition of EBS took place on May 22–23, 2017 and welcomed a wide range of high-level speakers for key moments including Minister Wolfgang Schäuble who spoke about Europe in a new world, CEO Jean-Pierre Clamadieu on Sustainable Development Goals, former Prime Minister Mario Monti on the future of the European economy, MEP Guy Verhofstadt on the future of Europe, and 10 EU Commissioners speaking on creating a new narrative for Europe.

== EBS 2018 ==
The 2018 edition of the Summit took place on May 23–24 in the Egmont Palace in Brussels. The theme of this edition was “Leading in a changing world: Europe at the forefront of global economic, social and political change”. The discussions focused on topics such as clean industry, ethics, trade, security and defence, digitalisation, energy and Brexit,

== Media ==
Every year the Summit attracts significant media attention, with over 250 journalists from international and European media outlets attending the event.

== List of summits ==
No.	Date	Theme	Location
16	23–24 May 2018	Leading in a changing world: Europe at the forefront of global economic, social and political change	Palais d'Egmont
15	22–23 May 2017	A New Narrative For Europe	Palais d'Egmont
14	1–2 June 2016	A Time For Bold Moves – Sharp Policies to Enable Business Solutions	Palais d'Egmont
13	6–7 May 2015	Europe 4.0 – Delivering a vision for the future of Europe	Palais d'Egmont
12	14–15 May 2014	The Business Agenda 2014 – 2019: Rebuilding a Competitive Europe	Palais d'Egmont
11	15–16 May 2013	Unlocking Industrial Opportunities – An EU Strategy for Competitiveness	Autoworld, Parc du Cinquantenaire
10	25–26 April 2012	Skills for Growth	Square - Brussels Meeting Centre
9	18–19 May 2011	Leading or Lagging?	Tour et Taxis
8	30 June–1 July 2010	Putting Europe back on Track	
7	2009	Dare and Care : sustaining Europe's ambitions – Financing, Staffing and Greening	
6	2007	Boosting Business in Europe & Europe in Business, 50 Years of Europe	
5	2004	Research and innovation: A European strategy for more growth and jobs	

== 'Knowledge partners' ==
- College of Europe
- Hill+Knowlton Strategies
- EurActiv
- Copenhagen Economics

== See also ==
- Common Agricultural Policy
- Defence policy of the European Union
- Energy policy of the European Union
- Environmental policy of the European Union
- European Economic Area
