= Thomas Leysen =

Belgian businessman (born 1960)

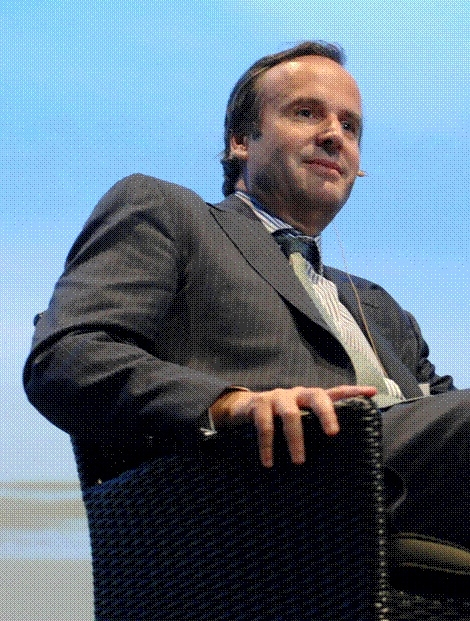
Thomas Leysen during Friends of Europe's State of Europe VIP roundtable and President's Dinner (2011)

Thomas Leysen (born 1960) is a Belgian entrepreneur who graduated from the Katholieke Universiteit Leuven with a degree in law.

== Career ==
Leysen spent a large part of his career at Umicore (formerly Union Minière), which was transformed under his leadership from a metals producer to a materials technology group with leading positions in battery materials, automotive catalysts and precious metals recycling. He was CEO of the company until 2008, after which he became chairman of the board.

Leysen was chairman of the Federation of Enterprises in Belgium (FEB) between 2008 and 2011.

Between 2011 and 2020, Leysen has been chairman of the board of KBC Group, a banking and insurance group with activities mainly in Belgium, Central Europe and Ireland.

Leysen is also the chairman and a large shareholder of Mediahuis, a media company and leading publisher of newspapers in Belgium, The Netherlands, Ireland, Luxembourg and Germany (De Standaard, De Telegraaf, NRC Handelsblad, Irish Independent, among other publications). In addition, he was chairman of the Belgian Corporate Governance Commission from 2014 till 2023. He has long been committed to the promotion of sustainability development, and was the founding chair of The Shift, a coalition of businesses and non-governmental organisations in Belgium.

Since March 2001, he is also Chairman of dsm-firmenich, a Swiss-Dutch health, nutrition and beauty group, listed on the Euronext Amsterdam.

== Other activities ==
=== Corporate boards ===
- Toyota, member of the global advisory board (2011 till 2018)
- Atlas Copco, member of the board (2001 till 2007)

=== Non-profit organizations ===
- Bilderberg Group, member of the steering committee
- European Round Table of Industrialists (ERT), member
- Friends of Europe, member of the board of trustees
- King Baudouin Foundation, chairman (2016 till 2021)
- Flemish Heritage Council, chairman (2014 till 2024)
- Rubenianum Fund, chairman
- Trilateral Commission, member of the European Group
- Federation of Belgian Enterprises (VBO), chairman (2008–2011)

== Sources ==
- Board of Directors (Umicore)
