= Flanders DRIVE =

Flemish automotive support organization

- Industry: Manufacturing, Automotive
- Headquarters: Belgium
- Website: www.flandersdrive.be

Flanders’ DRIVE is a Flemish non-profit organization. The aim of the organization is to support the vehicle suppliers with know-how through the Flanders’ DRIVE Network, and to provide infrastructure for the automotive industry through the Flanders’ DRIVE Engineering Centre.

In 2014, Flanders DRIVE, Flanders' Mechatronics Technology Centre (FMTC) and laboratories of the 5 Flemish universities merged into Flanders Make.

== See also ==
- Agoria
- Automotive Cluster of Wallonia
