= 1946 Sabena Douglas DC-4 crash =

Aviation accident in Canada

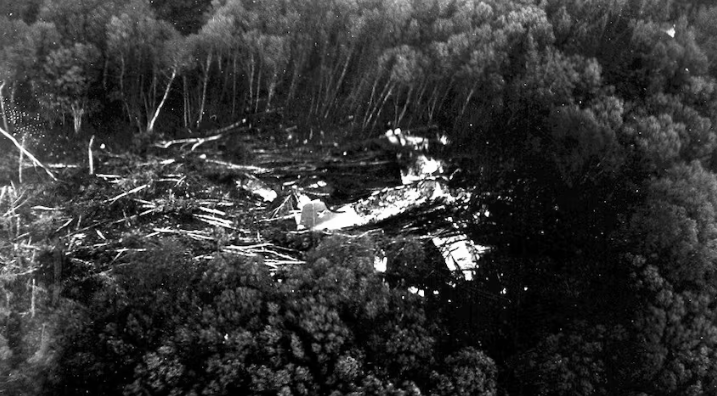
- A photo of the crash site

Accident
- Date: September 18, 1946
- Summary: Controlled flight into terrain
- Site: Gander, Newfoundland (Note: Newfoundland was later becoming part of Canada in 1949.); 48°41′30.0″N 54°55′20.0″W

Aircraft
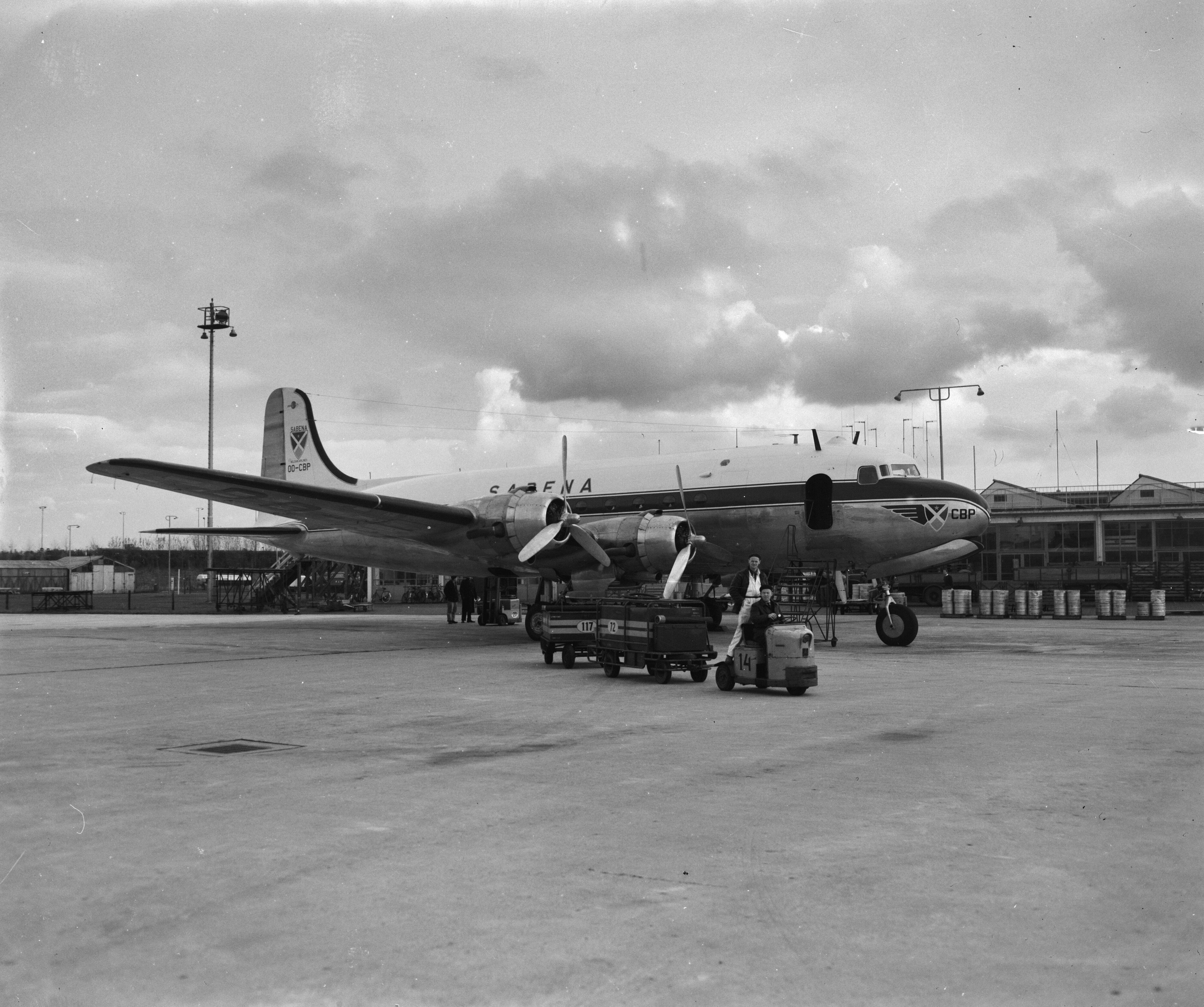
- A different Sabena Douglas DC-4, similar to the aircraft involved in the accident
- Aircraft type: Douglas DC-4
- Operator: Sabena
- Registration: OO-CBG
- Flight origin: Melsbroek Air Base, Brussels, Belgium
- 1st stopover: Shannon Airport, County Clare, Ireland
- 2nd stopover: Gander International Airport, Gander, Newfoundland
- Destination: LaGuardia Airport (Note: In 1946, LaGuardia was the only airport in New York), New York City, New York, United States
- Occupants: 44
- Passengers: 37
- Crew: 7
- Fatalities: 27
- Injuries: 17
- Survivors: 17

On September 18, 1946, a Douglas DC-4 operated by Sabena crashed 35 kilometres (22 mi) southwest of Gander, Newfoundland, killing 27 people and injuring 17 others. Although it was not yet part of Canada at the time, this accident was the 16th deadliest plane crash in Canadian history, the largest civilian plane crash of its time and the first large scale rescue using helicopters.

== Background ==
=== Aircraft ===
The aircraft involved in the accident was a Douglas DC-4-1009 operated by Sabena and manufactured by Douglas Aircraft Company in Santa Monica, California, United States. Sabena placed an order for four DC-4-1009 aircraft in November 1945. The first of these aircraft was delivered on February 13, 1946. The others were delivered in the same year. Sabena's planning foresaw use of the aircraft on connections with the Belgian Congo, as well as on new transatlantic flights. Biweekly flights to Idlewild Airport, were planned from June 4, 1947. The performance of the flights was tested prior to the formal commercial launch by a series of commercial tests ("proving flights"), nine of which were scheduled starting on July 5, 1946. They were all performed with OO-CBG.

=== Passengers and crew ===
37 passengers and six crew members were on board the flight. The pilot was John Ester and the first officer was Alfred Drossaert. Three other people were inside the cockpit: navigator John Verstraeten, flight engineer A. Fassbender and radio operator Jean Dutoict. There were also two flight attendants, Jeanne Bruylant and Jeanne Roeckx. Besides a majority of Belgian passengers, six Americans, two Luxembourgers and one Chinese man were on board. The Chinese man was John King, son of the Chinese ambassador to Belgium in Brussels. The Belgians were flying with the wife, two daughters, and the son of Sabena's CEO, Gilbert Périer; they were there to demonstrate the safety of transatlantic flights. Only one of the daughters and the son survived the flight. Henri Pauwels, a union leader and former minister for the PSC, was killed in the crash. Raymond Libeert, director of the Belgian linen weaving company Libeert & Cie, was traveling with his wife. Only his wife survived the crash. Architect Jean Polak was among the survivors.

== Crash ==
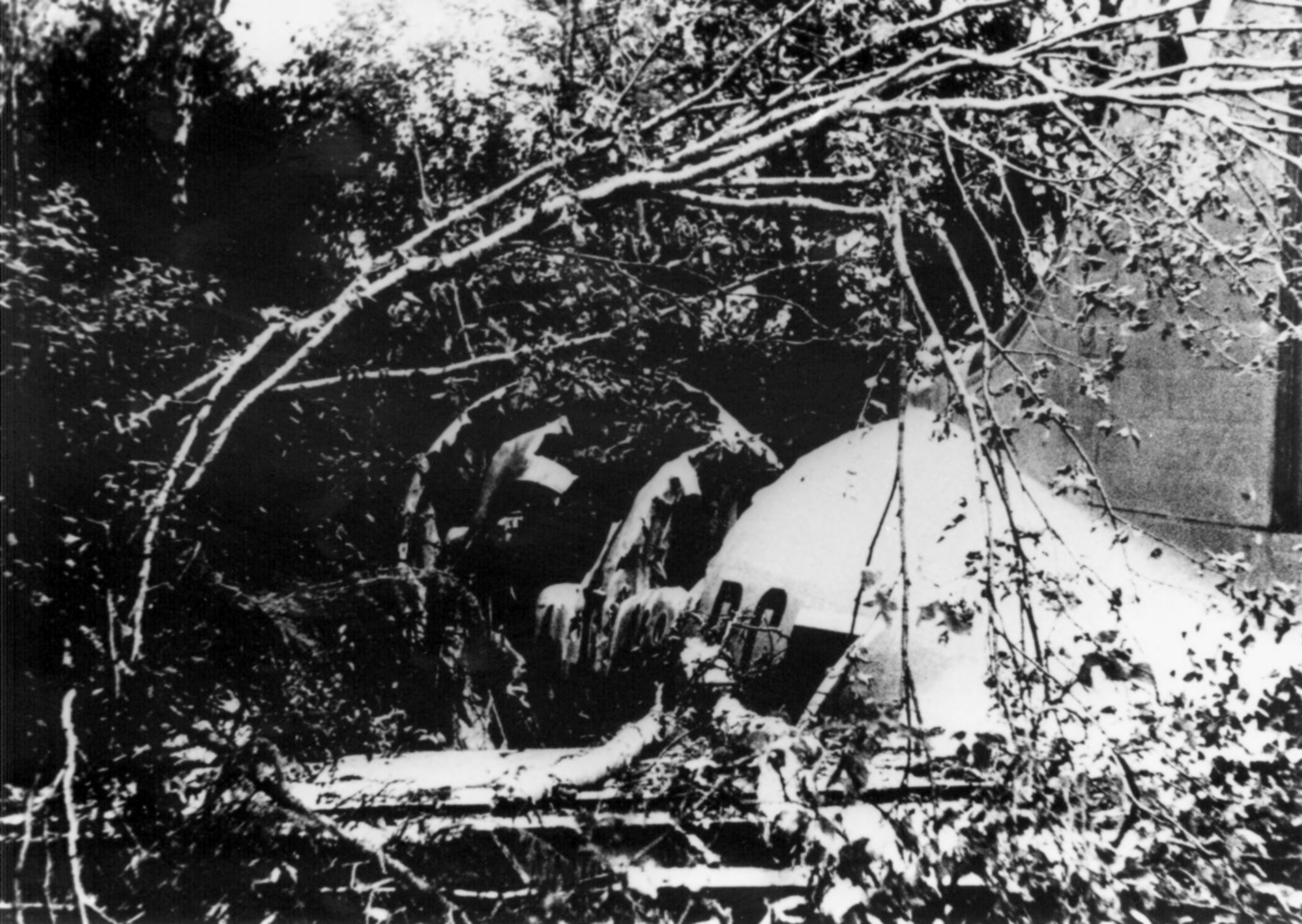
A photo taken by a United States Navy member of the wreckage

The aircraft was on a flight from Melsbroek Air Base in Brussels, Belgium, to LaGuardia Airport in New York City, United States, for a diamond exposition. Reportedly, the pilot attempted to carry out a visual approach in bad weather to Gander International Airport for a stopover by trying to descend below the clouds. Since the cloud base was about ground level, the plane crashed into trees in a dense wooded area, broke up and caught fire 35-kilometre (35,000 m) from the airport at 2:42 local time. Some of the passengers were reportedly thrown into trees. Unharmed survivors rescued injured victims from the burning wreckage, saving lives.

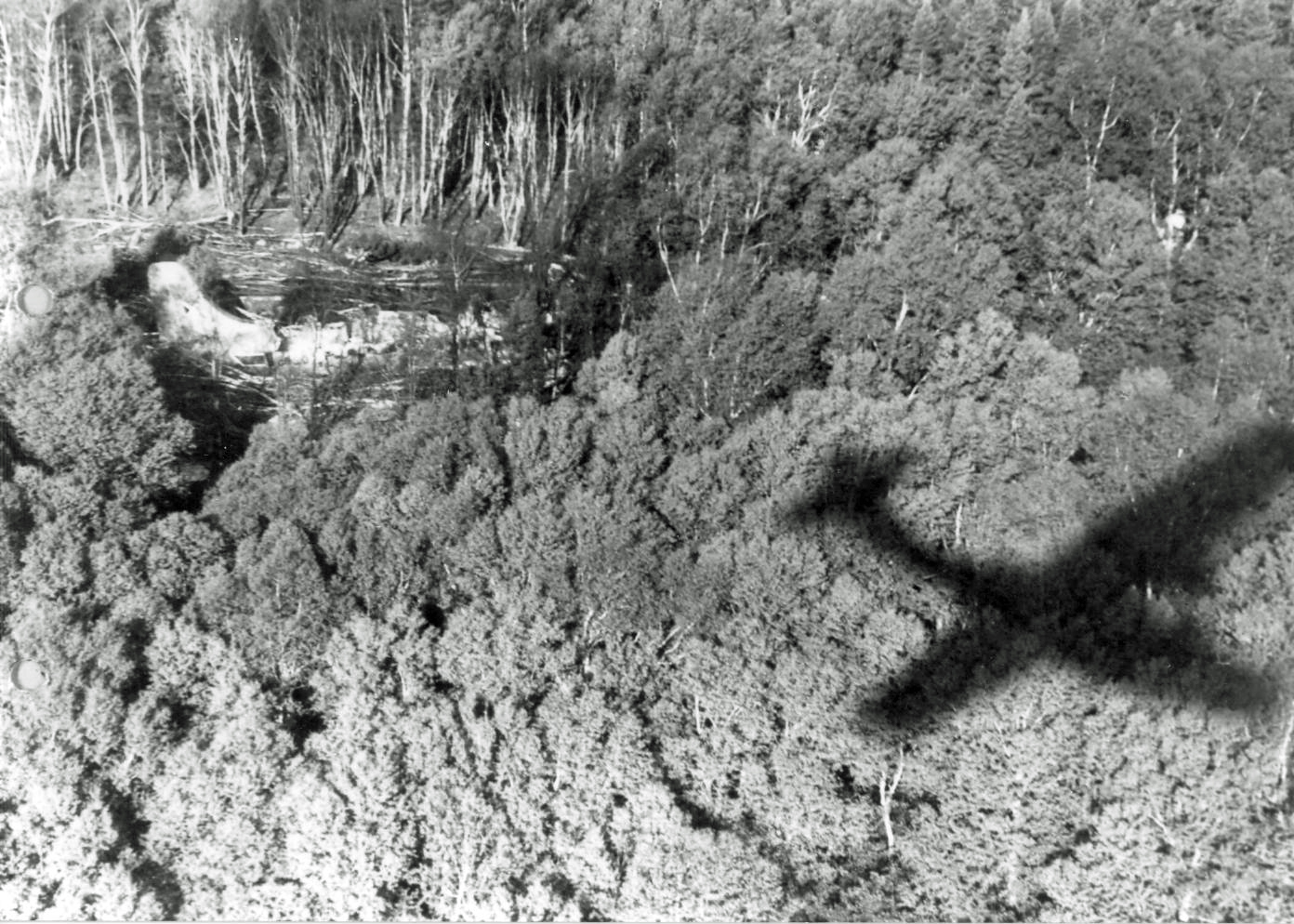
The wreckage of the aircraft viewed from a passing plane

The rescue was initiated by the United States Coast Guard after air traffic control notified them that they had lost radio contact with the aircraft, and had assured them the plane had not landed elsewhere. Reconnaissance flights were first conducted with a Consolidated PBY Catalina to locate the aircraft. A landing Trans World Airlines aircraft was the first to report the location of the crash site. The Coast Guard flew over the site, confirmed it was the missing Sabena aircraft, and confirmed that there were survivors. The first medical supplies were parachuted over the scene.

A United States Army medical team was deployed to Dead Wolf Pond, a small lake five miles from the crash site. From there, the team traveled on a small boat across a river and then on foot to the crash site. The physician, Dr. Martin, determined that this route could not be carried out with the injured, and the United States Coast Guard decided to launch a helicopter operation. The helicopters, a Sikorsky HNS-1 and a Sikorsky HOS-1, were disassembled and flown in by United States Air Force Douglas C-54 Skymaster aircraft from the Floyd Bennett Field in Brooklyn, and the Coast Guard Air Station Elizabeth City in Elizabeth City, North Carolina. At Gander International Airport, the helicopters were assembled and extensively tested, all within 48 hours of the crash.

Meanwhile, PBYs were dropping equipment over the crash site, including tents, medical supplies, and wooden beams. The wooden beams were used to build platforms on the peat for the tents and as landing pads for the helicopters.

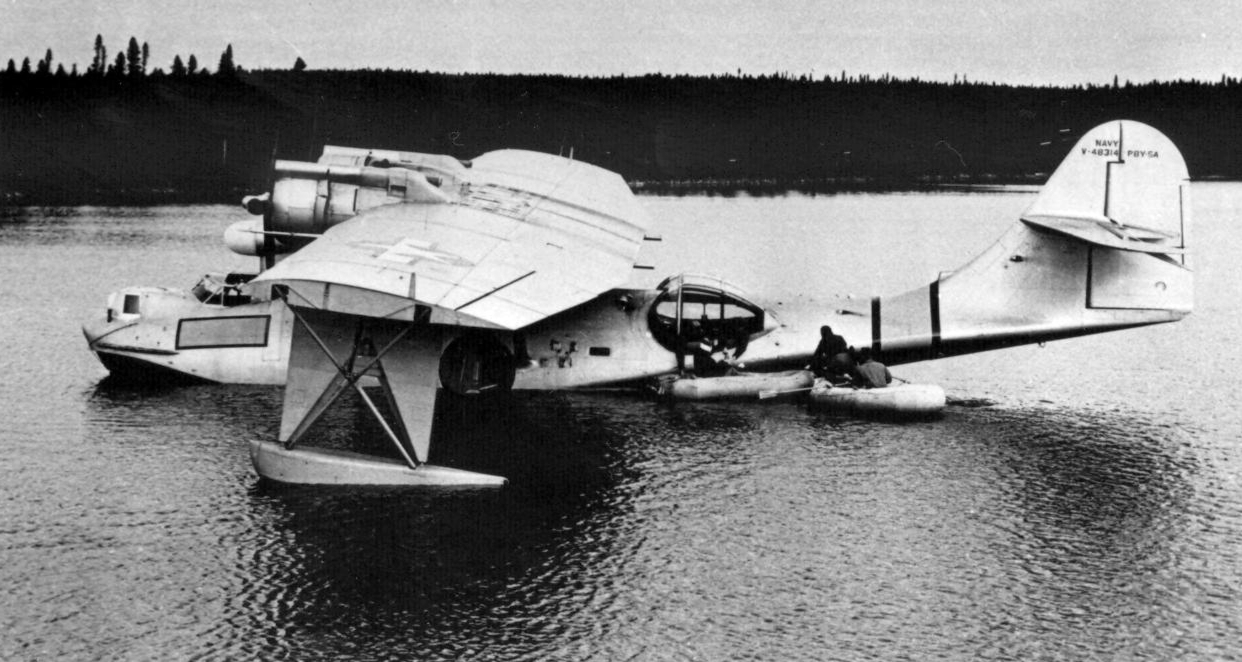
A United States Coast Guard flying boat transporting survivors on Gander Lake

Two days after the crash on September 20, helicopters landed on newly constructed landing pads at the crash site. The Coast Guard also had Consolidated PBY Catalina seaplanes on standby at Gander Lake. The injured were transferred by helicopters to a lifeboat, which then brought them to the fuselage of the aircraft, from where they could be flown to the Gander hospital for treatment. Five people initially survived the crash, but later died a day before rescue operations. Three others succumbed to their injuries throughout the night.

== Victims ==
Flight attendant Jeanne Roeckx and 16 passengers were rescued, while 27 others were killed. 15 people were severely injured, with many dying due to not being able to be transported. The other three survivors had barely any or no injuries.

The deceased victims were identified as:

- Joseph Alster
- Ann F. Beausillon
- Jeanne M. Bruylant
- Rose M. Dascotte
- R.L. Devooght
- Alfred E. Drossaert
- Albert A. Dumont
- Franz Dupont
- Jean Dutoict
- Jean Ester
- A. Fassbender
- Isabelle Henricot
- Raymond Libeert
- Nathan Lindenbaum
- Nelly Lowenthal
- H.W. Pauwels
- Marie H.W. Perier
- Marie J.J.A. Perier
- Hubert J. Reynaerdts
- Louise R. Reynaerdts
- L. Ruppert-Lehnertz
- L.G. Schyns
- L.C.J. Verstraeten
- G. Wachsberger-Commers
- Mary M. Wilson
- M.W. Wilson

An unnamed man who later succumbed to his injuries at Sir Frederick Banting Memorial Hospital in Gander.

The injured were identified as (Note: Including one person who later died. The victim who succumbed to their injuries was unidentified, so they can't be removed):

- Georges Cauchie
- Jef Deschuyffeleer
- Walter Devos
- Ruth Henderson
- Phillipe Henricot
- John King
- Charles Kronegold
- Selma Kronegold
- Rene J. Libeert
- Suzanne Martin
- Etienne Perier
- Jeanne Perier
- Jean Polak
- Judy Revel
- Jeanne Roeckx
- Leona Tonglet
- Leon Tonglet
- Betsy Wanderer

== Investigation ==
A probable cause was released stating that the pilot did not carry out the appropriate approach procedure for landing in bad weather conditions.

== Aftermath ==
A cemetery was built beside the crash site for the victims. A monument was erected by members of the 103 Search and Rescue Unit near it with the names of both survivors and fatalities. It was formally named St. Martin's in the Woods in honor of the physician in charge, Captain Samuel P. Martin, MD, United States Army Medical Corps, who had given his all for the wounded. The trail leading to the crash was called the "Sabena Crash Site Trail". As of 2024, the wreckage still remains at the site, and can be viewed by satellite imagery. Author Frank Tibbo wrote two books on the crash.

== See also ==
- 1948 Sabena Douglas DC-4 crash
- 1946 American Overseas Airlines Douglas DC-4 crash
