= Belgian Linen =

Trademark

The Belgian Flax and Linen Association
- Formation: 1 January 1950; 76 years ago
- Type: Trade association
- Headquarters: Poortakkerstraat 98, Ghent, Belgium
- Region served: European Union
- Parent organization: Fedustria
- Website: www.belgianlinen.com

Belgian Linen is a registered trademark of the Belgian Flax and Linen Association, a trade association that represents over 1,500 artisans and companies that grow and transform flax in Belgium. Since 1960, the association oversees and coordinates the Belgian Linen trademark. There are strict limitations on the use of the label: it has to match a set of quality standards and a certificate can be obtained only by Belgian companies. These standards include that at least 85% of the product by weight contains natural vegetable flax fibres of European Union-origin.

== History ==
=== 1946-1950 ===
During World War 2, flax was a valuable raw material. Due to its strength, the fabric was very convenient for the army (sails for trucks and trains, tents, uniforms,..). After the war, there was a scarcity of flax as the lands were mainly used for the cultivation of food. This resulted in the fiber becoming very expensive. The Belgian linen weavers formed ‘The Federation of Belgian Linen Weavers’ to distribute the available flax among each other, giving every weaver the same opportunities. During that period, André Dequae was appointed to the position of Secretary, a position he would keep for 40 years.

=== 1950-1970 ===
André Dequae was a native of Kortrijk and belonged to a family of flax cultivators. Later, he was known as a successful politician, with several nominations including as minister in the Belgian government. However, Dequae always kept an eye on the evolution of the flax fiber in the textile market. Partly due to the rise of flax within the Soviet Union, the (European) weavers formed an association to promote themselves internationally. On April 20, 1950, the ‘Confédération Internationale du Lin et du Chanvre’ (CILC) was created. The aim of this confederation was to bring together people of the flax industry from different countries, create guidelines and coordinate the promotion of European linen all over the world. In the same period, the Belgian flax association decided to do the same. Together they set up a ‘Flax Office’ in Brussels. Members of the association:

- The Belgian Flax Federation
- Flax Exporters Association
- JUTIBELIN (Association of Belgian jute and flax spinners)
- Verbond van Belgische Linnenwevers (Cooperation of Belgian Linen weavers)

=== 1970-1990 ===
By the early 1970s, the flax office had grown into a real organization with several agents worldwide and a head office in Brussels. In New York, there was an office that promoted Belgian flax under the name ‘Belgian Linen Association’. Since then, ‘Belgian Linen’ became a brand name. After the death of Pierre Bodson in the early 1980s, Stefaan Devies took over his function as general manager. In the following years, the Flax Office helped to promote flax through various events. The CICL organized ‘Fil d’OR’, an event that took place several times: in 1985 and 1987 in Monte Carlo and in 1989 in Paris. During this event, young designers were able to compete with each other to participate in a fashion show, attended by international press. The office coordinated the various entries by Belgian and Dutch designers together with the ITCB (Institut de Textile et Confection Belge).

=== 1990-... ===
In the early 1990s, the European Union provided subsidies for the promotion of European textiles and federations within European countries began to unite. In 1995, the Flax Office ended all promotional activities and the CILC took over this task. That same year, the CILC changed its name to CELC (Conféderation Européenne du Lin et du Chanvre). Under this new name, a label was created for all members: Masters of Linen. Despite the new European label, Belgian Linen remains a reliable reference for processors of linen fabrics. To this day, the label enjoys special status, especially in the United States. The management of the Belgian Linen label remained in the hands of the association behind the Flax Office. In 1999, the Flax Office became the 'Belgian Flax and Linen Association', and its management was transferred to Fedustria.

== Belgian Linen label in US ==
In the United States, Belgian Linen experienced competition from the established label ‘Irish Linen’. This label of the ‘Irish Linen Guild’, the guild of Northern Irish linen weaving, enjoyed a high reputation and was generally regarded as top quality. In order to compete with Irish Linen, the Flax Office opened an office in New York in the 1960s and the Belgian Linen label was promoted. To this day, the label is still highly regarded in the United States.

=== Logos ===
Logo	Name	Period of time	Comments
gecentreerd	Original Coat of Arms shield	1950-1970	The very first logo consisted of a shield with a crown on a white background. Two flax flowers were presented under the crown. In the center of the shield, a bundle of flax fiber is depicted from top to bottom. Two weaving shuttles are illustrated at the bottom of the shield. The crown indicated the type of fabric (half linen or flax linen) and in the middle, the composition was mentioned (flax cotton or pure linen).
gecentreerd	New Logo	1970-1995	From the 1970s, the Flax Office chose a new logo as promotional material. This new logo was kept until the discontinuation of all activities in 1995. However, US agents put it into use much later but it was less widely known in the US than the Coat of Arms label.
gecentreerd	Masters of Linen	1995-2015	After the discontinuation of all activities, the CELC created a new logo for all its members, intended for international promotion and communication. A part of the latest Belgian Linen logo was used to create the Masters of Linen logo. In 2015, the logo was slightly adjusted.
gecentreerd	Remake Coat of Arms	2015	In 2015, the label was slightly modernized and the colors were adjusted. ‘Belgian’ and ‘Linen’ were from now on always mentioned on the shield.
gecentreerd	Remake Masters of Linen	2015-...	100% Made in Europe was added on this label.

== Weavers ==
The following weavers are known to use the Belgian Linen label regularly:

- Deltracon
- Libeco
- Nelen & Delbeke
- Sofacover
- Verilin
- Weverij Flipts & Dobbels
