= Herman Van Rompuy =

Belgian politician (born 1947)

The Count Van Rompuy
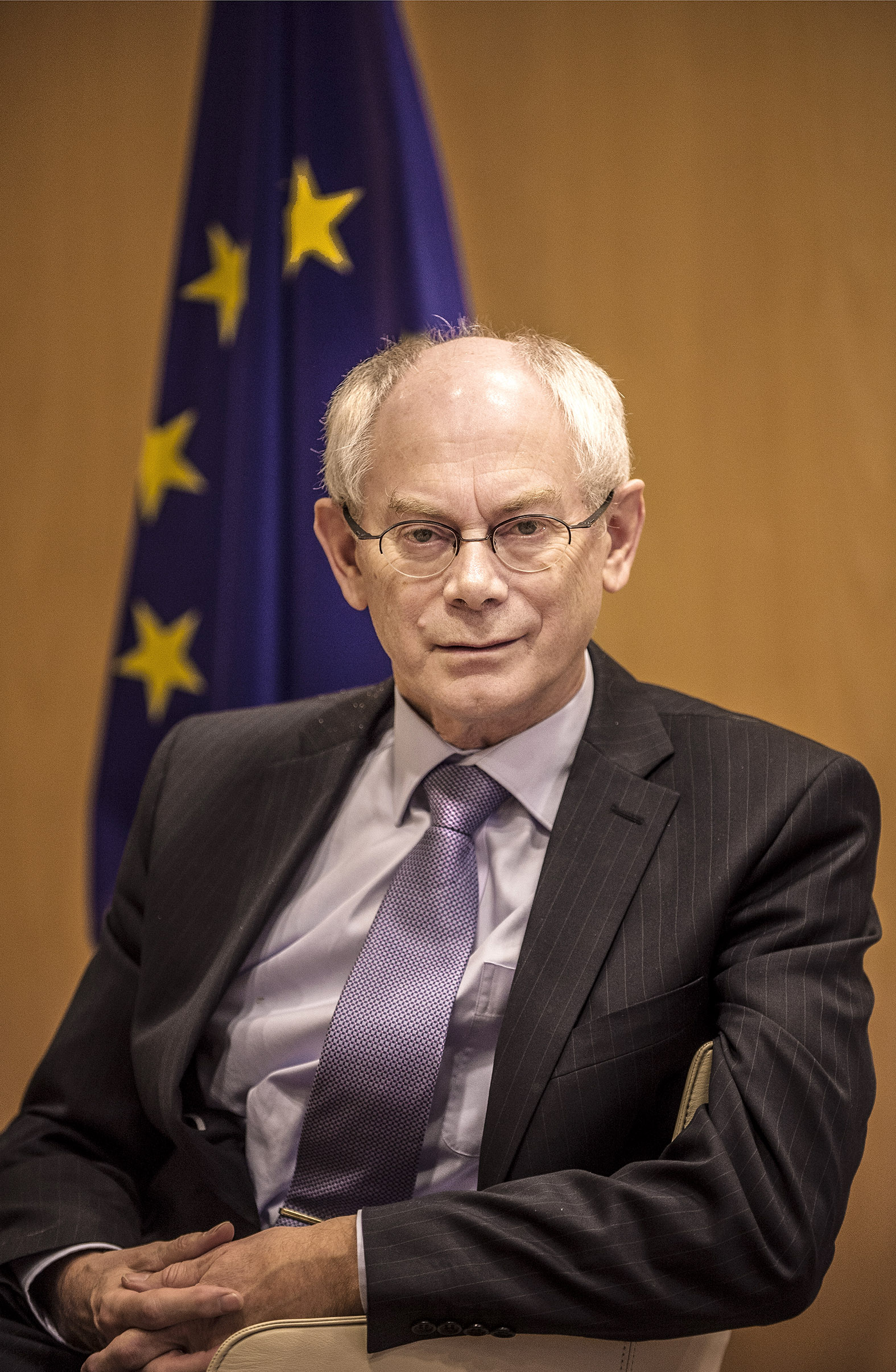
- Van Rompuy in 2012

President of the European Council
- In office 1 December 2009 – 30 November 2014
- Preceded by: Fredrik Reinfeldt (non-permanent)
- Succeeded by: Donald Tusk

Prime Minister of Belgium
- In office 30 December 2008 – 25 November 2009
- Monarch: Albert II
- Deputy: Didier Reynders
- Preceded by: Yves Leterme
- Succeeded by: Yves Leterme

President of the Chamber of Representatives
- In office 12 July 2007 – 30 December 2008
- Preceded by: Herman De Croo
- Succeeded by: Patrick Dewael

Minister of the Budget
- In office 5 September 1993 – 12 July 1999
- Prime Minister: Jean-Luc Dehaene
- Preceded by: Mieke Offeciers
- Succeeded by: Johan Vande Lanotte

Member of the Chamber of Representatives
- In office 21 May 1995 – 1 December 2009
- Constituency: Etterbeek

Senator
- In office 15 June 1988 – 21 May 1995
- Constituency: Etterbeek

Personal details
- Born: Herman Achille Van Rompuy; 31 October 1947 (age 78) Etterbeek, Belgium
- Party: Christian Democratic and Flemish
- Other political affiliations: European People's Party
- Spouse: Geertrui Windels
- Children: Peter; Laura; Elke; Thomas
- Education: Catholic University of Leuven

Herman Achille, Count Van Rompuy (Dutch: [ˈɦɛrmɑɱ vɑn ˈrɔmpœy]; born 31 October 1947) is a Belgian politician who served as Prime Minister of Belgium from 2008 to 2009, and later as the first permanent president of the European Council from 2009 to 2014.

Van Rompuy, a politician from Belgium's Christian Democratic and Flemish party, served as the 49th prime minister of Belgium from 30 December 2008 until 25 November 2009, when he was succeeded by his predecessor, Yves Leterme. On 19 November 2009, the European Council, which consists of the heads of state or government of the EU member states, selected Van Rompuy as its first full-time President under the Treaty of Lisbon. His term officially began on 1 January 2010 and was set to run until 31 May 2012 On 1 March 2012, he was re-elected for a second and final term, serving from 1 June 2012 to 30 November 2014. In 2019, he was appointed chairman of the board of the College of Europe.

== Early life, career and family ==
=== Early life ===
Born in Etterbeek, Brussels, Herman Achille Van Rompuy was the son of Victor Lodewijk Maurits "Vic" van Rompuy (Begijnendijk, 27 February 1923 – Begijnendijk, 14 November 2004), a later Professor of Economics, and wife Germaine Geens (Begijnendijk, 1 December 1921 – Begijnendijk, 23 November 2004), he attended Sint-Jan Berchmanscollege in Brussels until 1965, where Ancient Greek and Latin were his main subjects. During his early teens, he was an avid rock and roll fan, particularly of American singer Elvis Presley.

Later, he studied at the Katholieke Universiteit Leuven and received a bachelor's degree in philosophy in 1968, and a master's degree in applied economics in 1971. From 1972 to 1975, he worked at the Belgian Central Bank.

Between 1980 and 1987, he was a lecturer at the Handelshogeschool Antwerpen (now Lessius University College). From 1982, he was also taught at the Vlaamse Economische Hogeschool Brussel (VLEKHO), which later became part of Hogeschool-Universiteit Brussel and is now the University of Leuven Brussels campus.

=== Family ===
Van Rompuy is married to Geertrui Windels, with whom he has four children: Peter (born 1980), Laura (born 1981), Elke (born 1983), and Thomas (born 1986). His eldest son, Peter, is involved in the Christian Democratic and Flemish (CD&V) party and was a candidate in the 2009 Belgian regional elections.

His younger brother, Eric Van Rompuy, is also a politician in the CD&V and served as a minister in the Flemish Government from 1995 to 1999. His sister, Tine Van Rompuy, is affiliated with the Workers' Party of Belgium. His another sister, Anita Van Rompuy, is not politically active and is married to Arne van der Graesen.

== Political career ==
=== Early career ===
Van Rompuy was the chairman of the national Christian People's Party's (CVP) youth council (1973–1977). From 1975 to 1980, he worked in the ministerial cabinets of Leo Tindemans and Gaston Geens. In 1978 he was elected a member of the national CVP's bureau (1978–present). He first was elected to the Belgian Senate in 1988, and served until 1995. In 1988 he briefly served as Secretary of State for Finance and Small and Medium Enterprises before becoming the national chairman of the CVP (1988–1993).

=== Belgian Minister of Budget (1993–1999) ===
Van Rompuy was Deputy Prime Minister and Minister of Budget from September 1993 to July 1999, in the two governments led by Jean-Luc Dehaene. As budget minister, together with finance minister Philippe Maystadt, he helped drive down Belgium's debt from a peak of 135% of gross domestic product (GDP) in 1993. It fell to below 100% of GDP in 2003.

=== Member of the Belgian Chamber of Representatives (1995–2009) ===
He was elected to the Belgian Chamber of Representatives in the 1995 general election, but as he remained a minister, he was barred from taking the seat while holding that office. After his party's defeat in the 1999 Belgian general election, he became a member of the Chamber of Representatives. He was re-elected in 2003 and 2007. In 2004, he was designated Minister of State.

==== Position on Turkish accession to the European Union ====
Before he was president, Van Rompuy expressed reticence about possible Turkish membership of the EU. In 2004, he stated "An enlargement [of the EU] with Turkey is not in any way comparable with previous enlargement waves. Turkey is not Europe and will never be Europe." He continued "But it's a matter of fact that the universal values which are in force in Europe, and which are also the fundamental values of Christianity, will lose vigour with the entry of a large Islamic country such as Turkey."

As President, Van Rompuy has avoided opposing Turkish membership of the EU. On 23 December 2010, he said "Turkish reform efforts have delivered impressive results." He continued "Turkey plays an ever more active role in its neighbourhood. Turkey is also a full-standing member of the G-20, just like five EU countries and the EU itself. In my view, even before an outcome of the negotiations, the European Union should develop a close partnership with the Turkish Republic."

==== President of the Belgian Chamber of Representatives (2007–2008) ====
After eight years in opposition, CD&V (formerly known as CVP) returned to government. On 12 July 2007, Van Rompuy was elected as the president of the Belgian Chamber of Representatives, succeeding Herman De Croo.

=== Prime Minister of Belgium ===
On 28 December 2008, following the 2007–2008 Belgian political crisis, Van Rompuy was asked by King Albert II to form a new government after he was reluctant to take up the role of prime minister. He was sworn in as Belgian prime minister on 30 December 2008.

==== Taxes ====
On 13 October 2009, Bloomberg reported that the government of Herman Van Rompuy would seek to tax banks and nuclear power to tame the deficit.

==== Quote on financial recovery ====
"We are in the early stages of a recovery and at this time it is important not to weaken burgeoning confidence and to lay the foundations of a sustainable recovery" Van Rompuy said in a speech to parliament in Brussels. "Most important is to keep the direction. That will also provide stability and support."

==== Policy on government debt ====
On 13 October, Bloomberg reported the following about Van Rompuy's Government Debt Policy: "Belgium will trim its budget deficit to 5.3% of gross domestic product in 2011 from almost 5.7% both this year and next, according to a slide presentation handed out by State Secretary for the Budget Melchior Wathelet. Van Rompuy told Parliament earlier today that the deficit would widen to 5.4% of GDP this year. Belgium's deficit will be little changed next year as the shortfall at the level of regional governments and municipalities will widen to 1.5% of GDP from 0.7%, offsetting efforts by the federal government to trim its deficit. Government debt will start exceeding one year's worth of national output as of 2010, according to European Commission forecasts. Belgium had trimmed debt to as little as 84% of GDP in 2007, before bailouts of Fortis, Dexia SA, KBC Group NV and mutual insurer Ethias Group increased the nation's borrowing costs and inflated the debt ratio to 89.6% at the end of last year."

==== Negotiations and dispute with GDF Suez ====
On 22 October 2009, Reuters reported that the Van Rompuy government had signed a commitment with GDF Suez for nuclear power fees to Belgium. The outstanding dispute with GDF concerns the €250 million fee that Belgium is attempting to charge GDF for 2009 as part of its "Renewable Energy Fund" as stated in the article: "Belgium has also charged nuclear producers a total of 250 million euros for 2008, and the same for 2009, as well as 250 million euros this year payable to a renewable energy fund. These fees remain in dispute. The producers are challenging the 2008 payment in Belgium's constitutional court. A spokesman for Van Rompuy said the government would pass a law to enforce the 500 million euro charge for this year, adding that this could also be contested by GDF Suez."

=== President of the European Council (2009–2014) ===
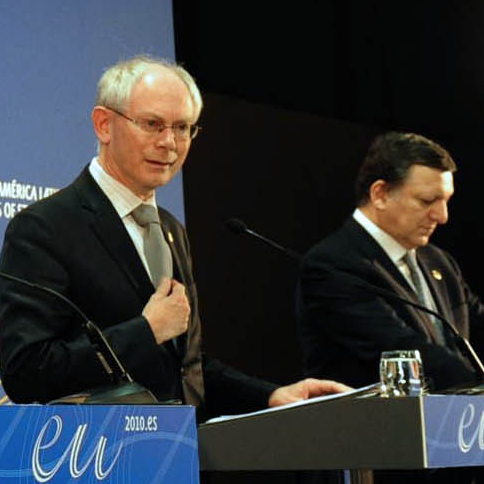
Van Rompuy in a joint press conference with José Manuel Barroso, the president of the European Commission in May 2010

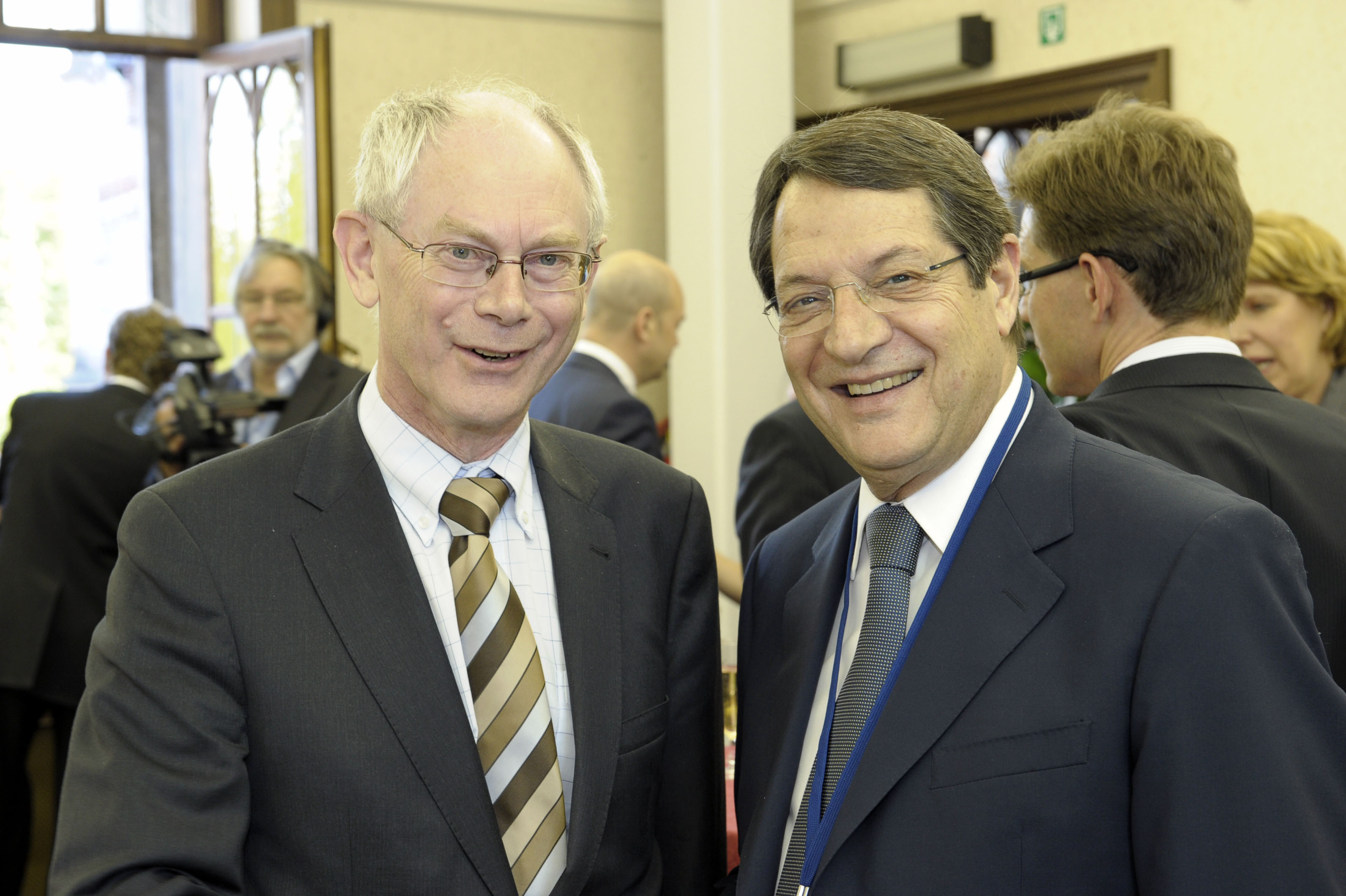
Herman Van Rompuy with Nicos Anastasiades, June 2010

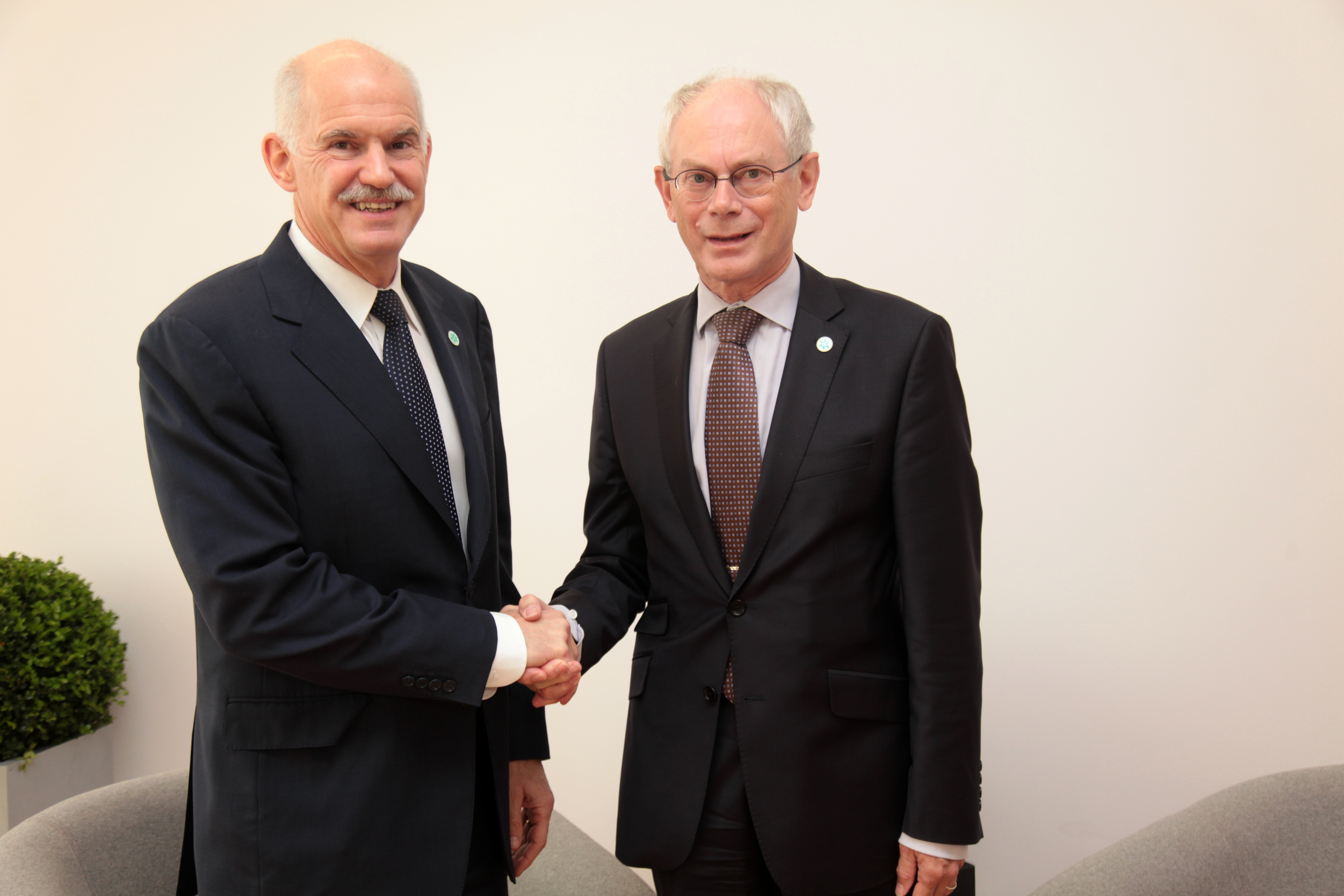
Van Rompuy with Greek prime minister George Papandreou, September 2011

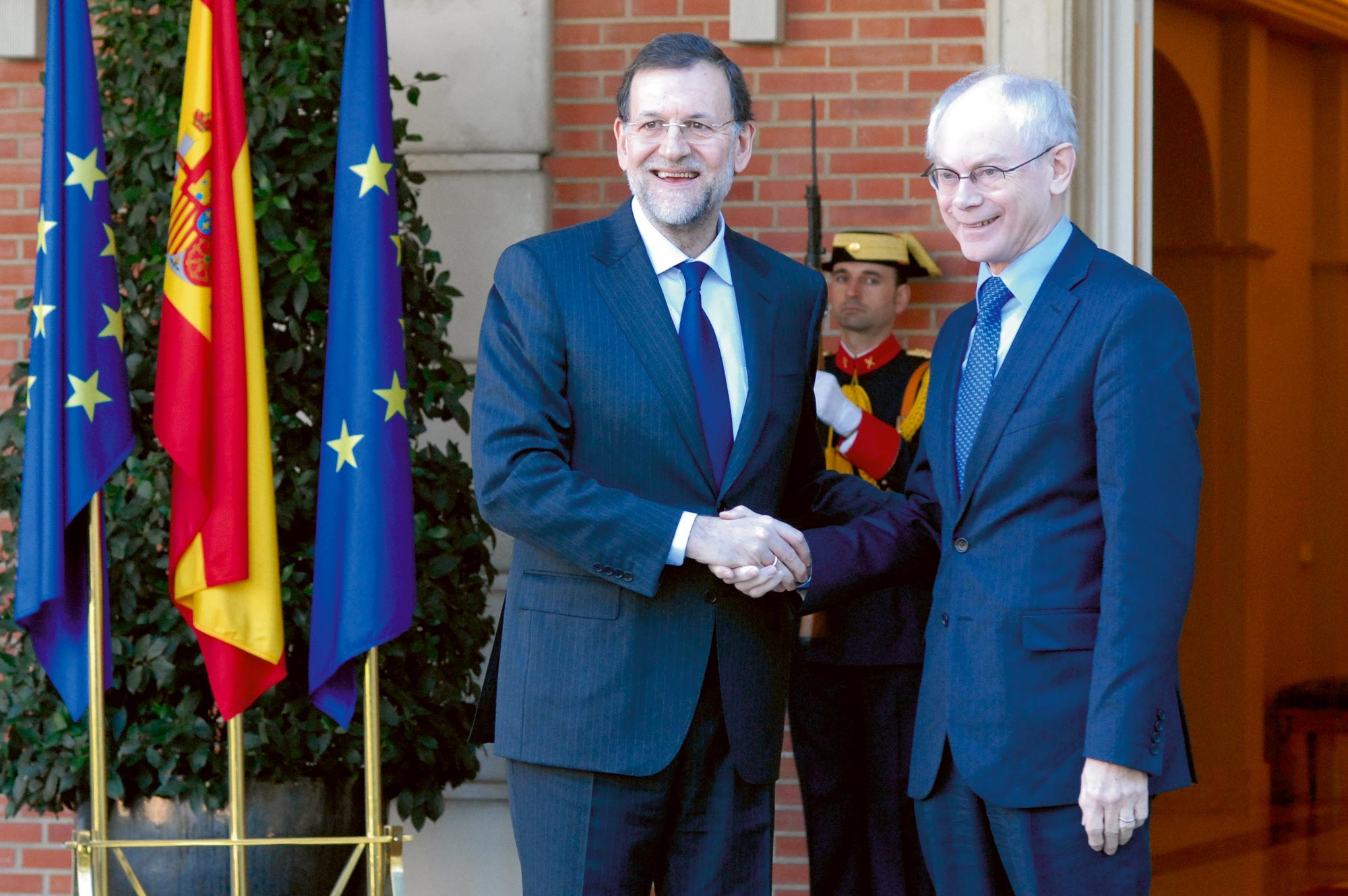
Van Rompuy with Spanish prime minister Mariano Rajoy, January 2012

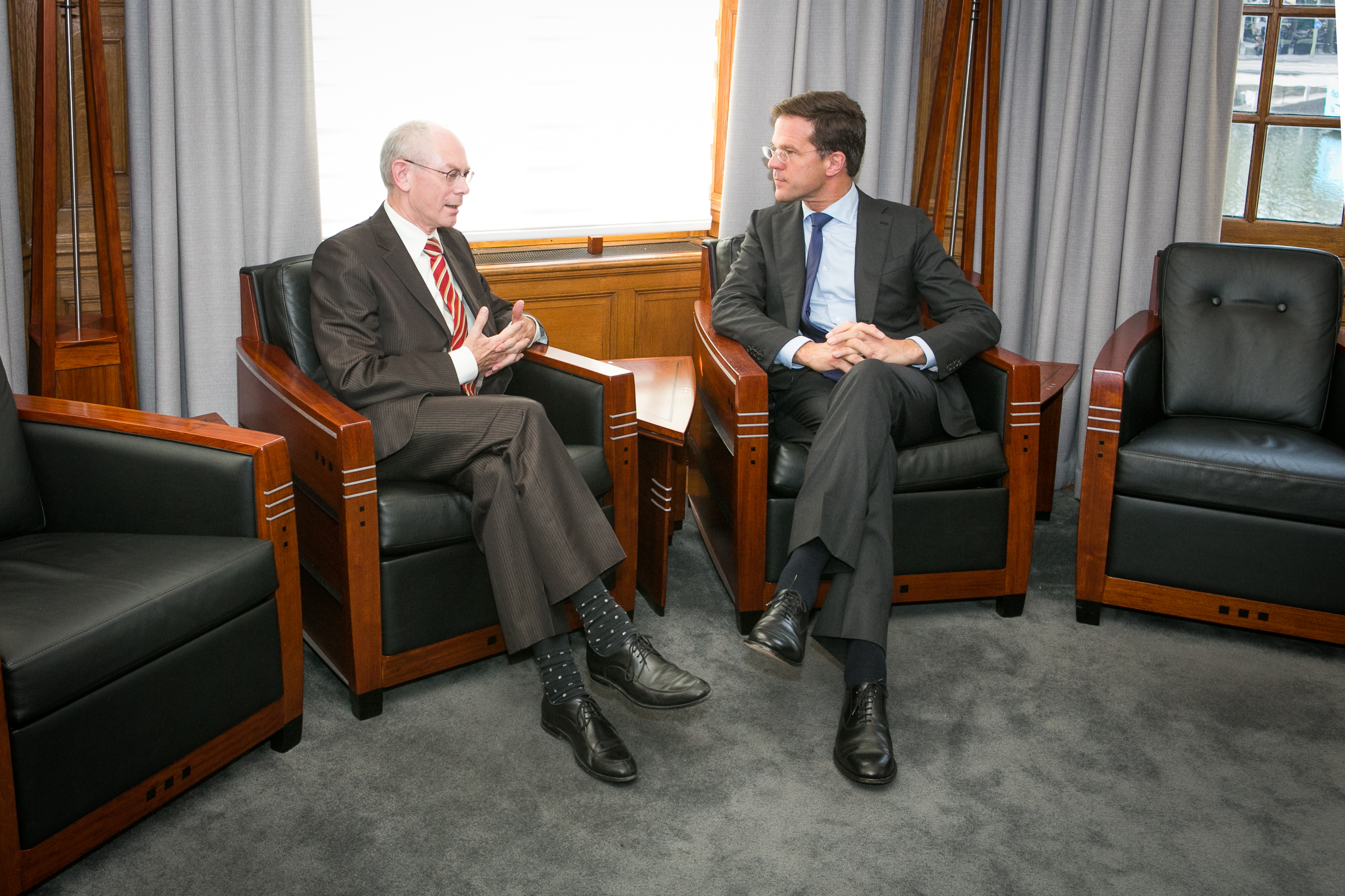
Van Rompuy with Dutch prime minister Mark Rutte, April 2013

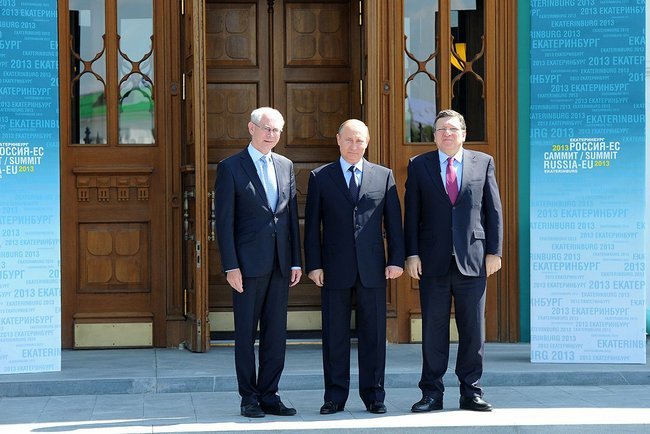
Van Rompuy with Russian president Vladimir Putin and President of the European Commission José Manuel Barroso, June 2013

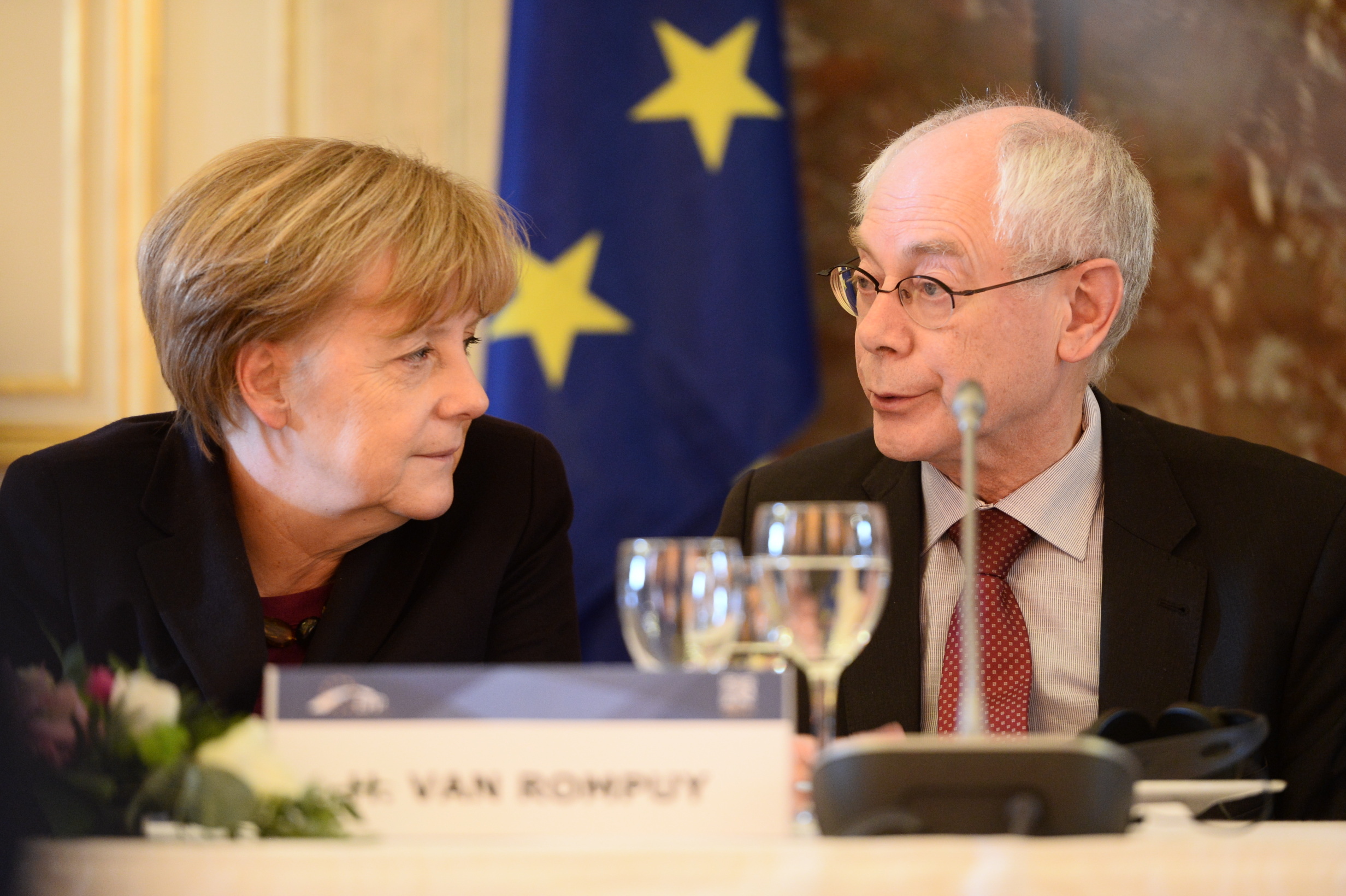
Van Rompuy with German chancellor Angela Merkel, March 2014

On 19 November 2009, Van Rompuy was chosen unanimously by the European Council, at an informal meeting in Brussels, to be the first full-time President of the European Council; for the period of 1 December 2009 (the entry into force of the Treaty of Lisbon) until 31 May 2012. He took up his position officially on 1 January 2010.

Gordon Brown also praised Van Rompuy as "a consensus-builder" who had "brought a period of political stability to his country after months of uncertainty". This opinion is shared by others; he has been described as the painstaking builder of impossible compromises (l'horloger des compromis impossibles) A statement made by Van Rompuy at a news conference after his selection illustrates his approach:

Every country should emerge victorious from negotiations. A negotiation that ends with a defeated party is never a good negotiation. I will consider everyone's interests and sensitivities. Even if our unity remains our strength, our diversity remains our wealth." He has also described his role of chairing a body composed of 27 heads of state or government (and finding consensus among them) as being "neither a spectator, nor a dictator, but a facilitator

Given Van Rompuy's support for Europe and opposition to far right, not all parties and factions had positive words for him when he took office. British MEP and Eurosceptic Nigel Farage attacked the freshly appointed president by stating that he had "the charisma of a damp rag and the appearance of a low grade bank clerk." The remarks generated controversy and he was fined €3000 (ten days' pay) by the president (speaker) of the European Parliament for his unparliamentary comments.

In a November 2009 press conference, Van Rompuy related to global governance by stating: "2009 is also the first year of global governance with the establishment of the G20 in the middle of a financial crisis; the climate conference in Copenhagen is another step towards the global management of our planet." Van Rompuy referred to the United Nations Climate Change Conference 2009.

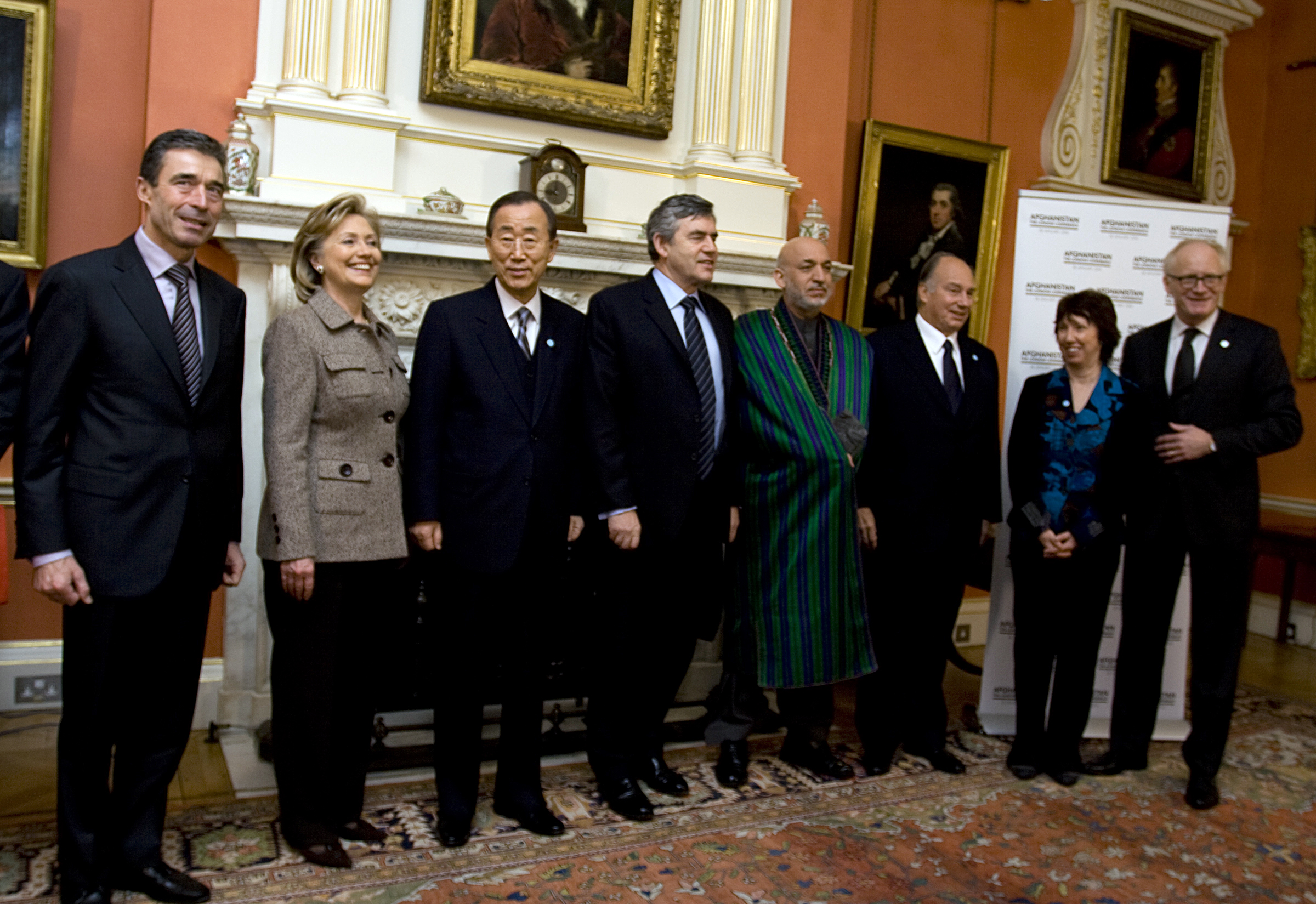
World leaders host Hamid Karzai at the London Conference on Afghanistan, 28 January 2010

On 28 January 2010, Van Rompuy attended the 2010 International Conference on Afghanistan at Lancaster House in London. It was at this event that the framework for the next decade of the Islamic Republic of Afghanistan was settled by the Afghan president Hamid Karzai and his successor Ashraf Ghani and their donors. As seen at right, Gordon Brown, Hillary Clinton, Catherine Ashton and Anders Fogh Rasmussen amongst other Western leaders were in attendance.

In or just before the first months of his presidency Van Rompuy visited all EU member states, he also organised an informal meeting of the heads of state of the EU. The meeting took place on 11 February 2010, in the Solvay Library (Brussels), topics to be discussed were the future direction of the economic policies of the EU, the outcome of the Copenhagen Conference and the then recent earthquake in Haiti.

In fact, the meeting was in part taken over by the growing sovereign debt crisis (at that time, Greece), which was to become the hall mark of Van Rompuy's first two years as president. With EU member states holding divergent positions on this issue, he had to find compromises, not least between France and Germany, at subsequent European Council meetings and summits of Eurozone heads of state or government leading to the establishment of the three-year European Financial Stability Mechanism (EFSM) and the European Financial Stability Facility (EFSF) in May 2010, to provide loans to Greece (and later Ireland and Portugal) to help stabilise their borrowing costs, but subject to strict conditions.

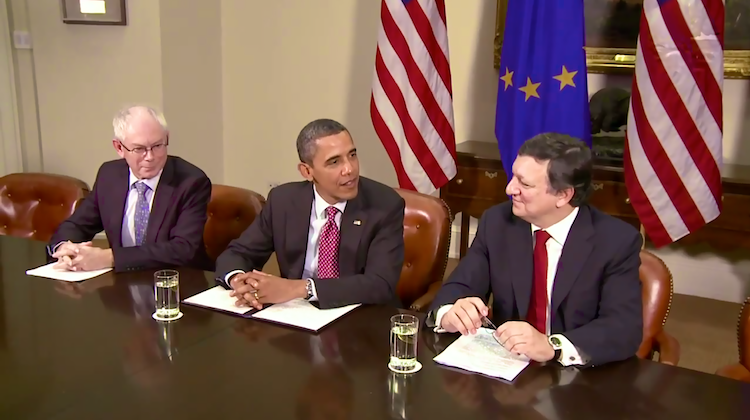
Van Rompuy with U.S. president Barack Obama and President of the European Commission José Manuel Barroso, November 2011

The European Council also gave him the assignment of chairing a task force on economic governance, composed of personal representatives (mostly ministers of finance) of the heads of government, which reported ahead of schedule to the October 2010 European Council. Its report, which proposed stronger macro-economic co-ordination within the EU in general and the Eurozone in particular and also a tightening of the Stability and Growth Pact was endorsed by the European Council. The latter also charged him with preparing, by December 2010, a proposal for a limited change to the treaty required to enable a more permanent financial stability mechanism. His draft – for an addition to Article 136 TFEU, pertaining to the Eurozone – was endorsed by the European Council at its October 2010 meeting.

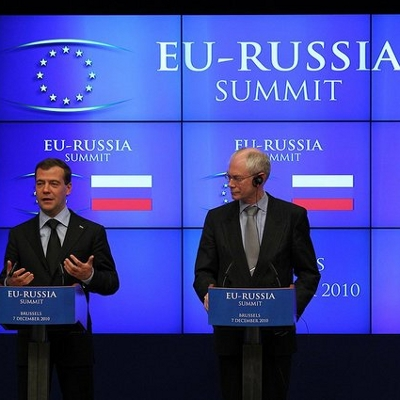
Van Rompuy with Russian president Dmitry Medvedev, December 2010

His second year in office, 2011, was also marked by a deterioration of the Greek debt crisis, leading to Van Rompuy calling an extraordinary meeting of the Eurozone heads of state or government in July to adopt a first package of further measures (notably longer-term loans at lower interest rates, private sector debt-writedown, further fiscal consolidation in Greece) and again in October (in conjunction with full European Council meetings) to contain contagion from Greece to other countries (through bank recapitalisation across Europe and by leveraging the firepower of the EFSF to about €1 trillion).

His first two years were also marked by his role in co-ordinating European positions on the world stage at G8 and G20 summits and bilateral summits, such as the tense 5 October 2010, EU-China summit. He called a special European Council at short notice in early 2011, on the emerging Libya crisis, which, in agreeing conditions for military intervention, made it impossible for Germany to oppose such intervention once the conditions were fulfilled.

On 1 March 2012, Van Rompuy was re-elected unanimously as President of the European Council by the heads of state or government of the 28 EU member states. President Van Rompuy's second term lasted for two and a half years, from 1 June 2012 to 30 November 2014. After this second mandate he could not have been re-elected because the European Council President's term of office can only be extended once.

Van Rompuy was also appointed as the first president of the Euro Summit, and this for the same term of office as his Presidency of the European Council. The Euro Summit meetings are to take place at least twice a year.

In 2014, Van Rompuy was awarded the International Charlemagne Prize of Aachen for his EU role.

==== President's cabinet ====
Although the European Council is, under the terms of the Lisbon treaty, a separate institution of the EU, it does not have its own administration. The administrative support for both the European Council and its president is provided by the General Secretariat of the Council of the European Union.

The president does have, however, his own private office (cabinet) of close advisers. Van Rompuy chose as his chief of staff (chef de cabinet) Baron Frans van Daele, formerly Belgian ambassador to, variously, the US, the UN, the EU and NATO and chief of staff of several Belgian foreign ministers. Also in his team were the former (and later) UK Labour MEP Richard Corbett, former Hungarian ambassador to NATO Zoltan Martinusz, former head of the EU's economic & financial committee Odile Renaud-Basso, Dutch philosopher and journalist Luuk van Middelaar, his main speech writer, and Van Rompuy's long standing press officer Dirk De Backer.

In 2013, Frans Van Daele retired both as a diplomat and as chief of staff of Van Rompuy, and was appointed chief of staff to His Majesty King Philippe. He was succeeded as chief of staff of Herman Van Rompuy by Didier Seeuws.

== Later career ==
When the EPP membership of Hungarian party Fidesz was suspended in 2019, EPP president Joseph Daul appointed van Rompuy – alongside Hans-Gert Pöttering and Wolfgang Schüssel – to a group of high-level experts who were mandated to monitor Fidesz's compliance with EPP values.

He was appointed chairman of the board of the College of Europe in 2019.

== Other activities ==
=== Corporate boards ===
- Dexia, board member and member of the audit committee (before 2008)

=== Educational institutions ===
- Centre International de Formation Européenne (CIFE), President

=== Non-profit organizations ===
- Club of Madrid, Member
- European Policy Centre (EPC), chair of the Strategic Council
- New Pact for Europe, chair of the Advisory Group
- Trilateral Commission, member of the European Group

== Honours ==
=== Belgian honoursBelgium ===
Coat of arms of Herman Van Rompuy

  - Created Count van Rompuy, by Royal Decree of 8 July 2015 of King Philippe.
  - Minister of State, by Royal Decree of 26 January 2004 of King Albert II.
  - Order of Leopold:
    - Commander, by Royal Decree of 22 May 2003 of King Albert II.
    - Grand Cordon, by Royal Decree of 23 December 2009 of King Albert II.

=== Foreign honours ===
- Benin: Grand Cross of the National Order of Benin
- France: Grand Officier of the Legion of Honour
- Ivory Coast: Grand Officer of the National Order of the Ivory Coast
- Japan: Grand Cordon (or 1st Class) of the Order of the Rising Sun
- Netherlands: Knight Grand Cross of the Order of Orange-Nassau (10 October 2014)
- Romania: Grand Cross of the Order of the Star of Romania
- Slovakia: Grand Officer (or 2nd Class) of the Order of the White Double Cross
- Gold Medal of the Jean Monnet Foundation for Europe, in 2014.
- Slovenia: Order for Exceptional Merits

=== Honorary citizenships ===
- Beersel, Belgium (13 May 2012)
- De Haan, Belgium (7 July 2012)
- Olen, Belgium (3 October 2013)
- Matsuyama, Japan (18 November 2013)
- Kortessem, Belgium (16 May 2014)

=== Academic honorary degrees ===
- Belgium:
  - Doctor honoris causa from the Catholic University of Louvain (2 February 2010)
  - Doctor honoris causa from the Ghent University (18 March 2011)
  - Doctor honoris causa from the Catholic University of Leuven (1 June 2012)
- Japan: Doctor honoris causa from the Kobe University (4 March 2011)
- Azerbaijan: Doctor honoris causa from the Azerbaijan University of Languages (5 July 2012)
- Vietnam: Doctor honoris causa from the Vietnam National University, Hanoi (1 November 2012)
- Spain: Doctor honoris causa from the CEU San Pablo University (12 December 2013)
- Benin: Doctor honoris causa from the university of Abomey-Calavi (21 February 2014)
- Netherlands: Doctor honoris causa from the VU University Amsterdam (20 October 2015)
- United Kingdom: Honorary LL.D. degree from the University of St Andrews (21 June 2016)
- United Kingdom: Honorary D.C.L. degree from the University of Kent (14 July 2016)
- Canada: Honorary LL.D. degree from Carleton University (18 November 2017)

=== Awards ===
- Germany: Charlemagne Prize (29 May 2014)
- Netherlands: Benelux-Europa Prize (12 June 2010)
- Belgium: Harvard Club of Belgium Leadership Prize (8 September 2010)
- Luxembourg: Collier du Mérite européen awarded by the European Merit Foundation (25 November 2010)
- Spain: Nueva Economía Forum Prize (10 December 2010)
- Belgium: Golden medal of the Royal Flemish Academy of Belgium for Science and the Arts (14 January 2012)
- Belgium: Honorary senator E Meritu et Honoris Causa of the Movement for a United States of Europe – Action Centre for European federalism (AEF – BVSE), Antwerp (5 February 2012)
- Netherlands: Otto von der Gablentz Prize (18 April 2012)
- Austria: European Prize Coudenhove-Kalergi (16 November 2012)
- Belgium: Michele de Gianni Award (4 October 2013)
- Poland: Golden Business Centre Club Statuette Award, awarded at the Grand Gala of Polish Business Leaders, Warsaw (25 January 2014)
- Germany: ESMT Responsible Leadership Award, awarded by the European School of Management and Technology, Berlin, (3 July 2014)
- Netherlands: Comenius prize (2 April 2016)

Political offices
Preceded by Mieke Offeciers	Minister of the Budget; 1993–1999	Succeeded by Johan Vande Lanotte
Preceded by Herman De Croo	President of the Chamber of Representatives; 2007–2008	Succeeded by Patrick Dewael
Preceded by Yves Leterme	Prime Minister of Belgium; 2008–2009	Succeeded by Yves Leterme
Preceded by Fredrik Reinfeldt	President of the European Council; 2009–2014	Succeeded by Donald Tusk
Diplomatic posts
Preceded by David Cameron	Chair of the Group of Seven; 2014; Served alongside: José Manuel Barroso	Succeeded by Angela Merkel
Awards
Preceded by Dalia Grybauskaitė	Laureate of the Charlemagne Prize; 2012	Succeeded by Martin Schulz
