= Libeco =

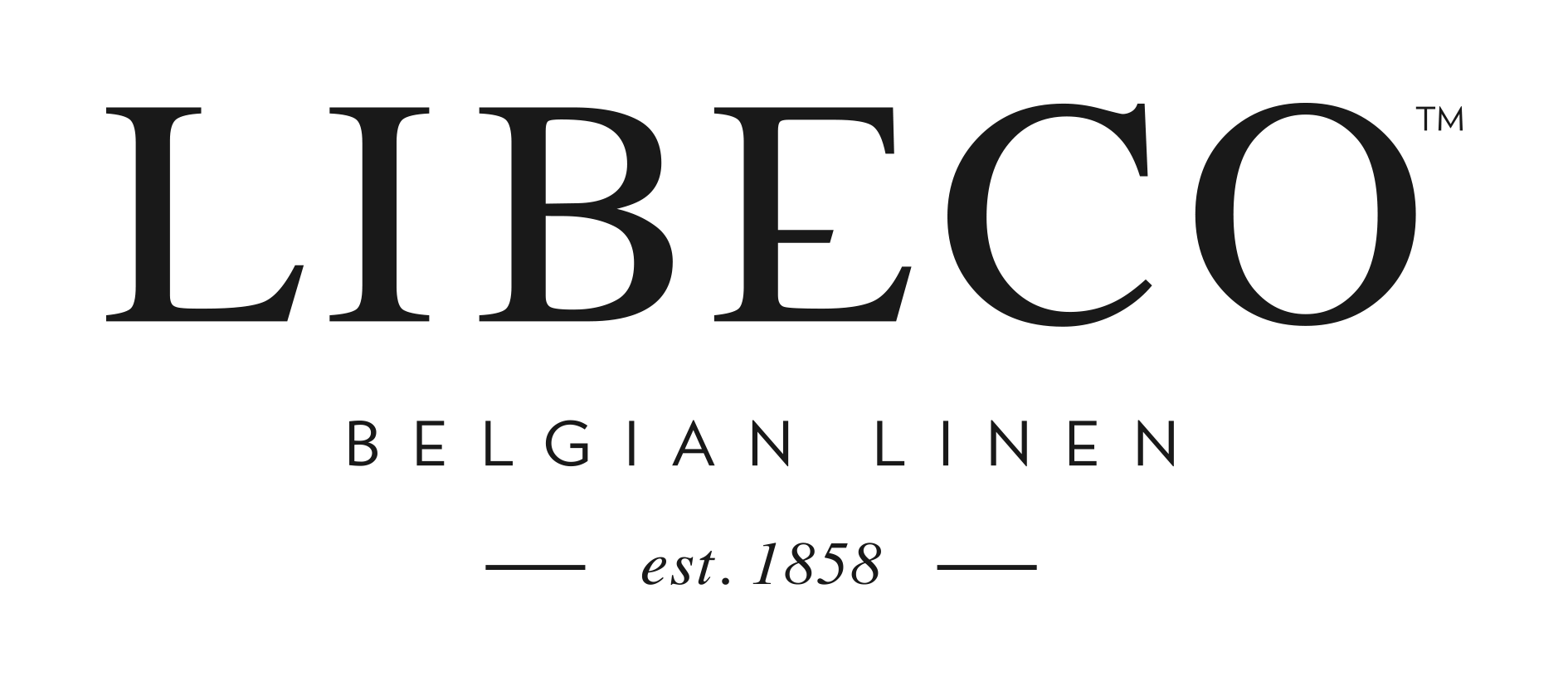
- Formerly: Libeert & Cie; Victor Lagae & Louis Carton; Lagae Linens
- Industry: Textiles
- Founded: 1864; 162 years ago (Libeert & Cie); Kortrijk, Belgium; 1858; 168 years ago (Victor Lagae & Louis Carton); Kortrijk, Belgium
- Founders: Paul Libeert; Victor Lagae
- Headquarters: Meulebeke, Belgium
- Area served: Worldwide
- Key people: Didier Dejaegher (CEO)
- Number of employees: 215 (2026)
- Website: Libeco; Libeco Home

Libeco is a Belgian textile company which manufactures and distributes linen and linen products. The company grew out of the merger of Libeco and Lagae on 2 June 1997. The head office is located in Meulebeke in a region of Flanders, Belgium, which is known for its flax culture and textile industry.

== History ==
=== Lagae Linens ===
Victor Lagae founded, together with Louis Carton, a company specialized in handkerchief linens and batiste, in the city of Kortrijk in 1858. From the farms in the surroundings of the city, the woven linen would be transported by cart to their warehouse, situated close to the train station. After the retiring of Louis Carton, Victor Lagae continued on his own. When he died in 1898, his widow remarried with a French engineer, Maurice Hallot. For a short while, the linen of the factory would go under the name Hallot-Martin. At the turning of the century, the company added linen-cotton and pure cotton handkerchief linen to its collection. In 1910, Maurice handed over the firm to both sons of Victor: Georges and Alfred. The company name changed to Georges et Alfred Lagae.

In 1937 Joseph Lagae, son of Georges, joined the company, which was then renamed to Lagae Linens. After they bought the mill of De Gryse Weavers in Meulebeke, Lagae would start weaving their own fine linen. Due to heavy bombing by allied forces during World War II, the company lost all its archives and office buildings. In 1960 the company built a new mill in Meulebeke.

=== Libeert & Cie ===
==== 1864–1937 ====
Like Victor Lagae, entrepreneur Paul Libeert saw an opportunity in opening a trade company of linens, situated near the station of Kortrijk. He founded Libeert & Cie in 1864 and aimed to buy and sell the heavier variants of linen. The company bought linen from the cottage industry in the regions of Sint-Eloois-Winkel and Meulebeke and brought everything to a central warehouse in Kortrijk. By the end of the century, the company studied the possibilities of weaving their own fabrics. In 1905, Albert Libeert succeeded his father as director of the company. He introduced mechanization in the mill, by installing steam powered looms. By the end of World War I the mill counted over 140 looms. At that point demand of high quality linen was high, especially in South America, which eventually became the company's largest export market in that period.

==== 1937–1946 ====
A few years before[World War II, two of Albert's sons, Raymond and Paul, were elected to take control of the family business. After the Battle of Belgium, the family Libeert closed the factory, as they refused to manufacture military equipment for the German army. Once Belgium was liberated, there was an increasing shortage of flax. A new organization, the Association of Linen Producers had to collect the flax yarns and distribute the flax yarn to its members, about 35 linen weavers. Raymond Libeert was elected president of the organization. Because of the market potential at that time for linen weavers the United States, Raymond wanted to go to New York to open a sales outlet. Raymond and his wife Renée took the plane from Brussels to New York on 17 September 1946. However, due to bad weather conditions the airplane crashed about 30 kilometers from Gander International Airport in Newfoundland, Canada.

==== 1946–1997 ====
Together with Raymond's brother Paul, Renée held on to the mill. She even introduced a specific line of colored and striped linen fabric, which would become very popular. In 1958 the next generation was ready to take over: Claude, Yves (both sons of Paul) and Jean-Loup Libeert (son of Raymond). By then the mill was hopelessly outdated. What's more, cheap synthetic fibers were gaining popularity and the demand for linen decreased at a high rate. Jean-Loup, however, convinced the family of investing in the company. The mill was rebuilt with the necessities and technology of that time. The steam powered looms were replaced with electrical looms. As the production grew steadily, the offices were moved from the center of Kortrijk to Meulebeke by 1964.

=== Merger ===
Both companies worked side to side and were no strangers. Their common interest in the European Linen and Hemp Confederation had brought them closer together. Patrick Lagae, 4th generation after Victor, and Jean-Loup Libeert opened the first discussions on a merger in 1994 and by 1997 both companies merged into Libeco-Lagae. The conservation of employees, production methods and knowledge were the cornerstones of the merger and had to be guaranteed by both parties. In 2008, Patrick Lagae sold his shares to the Libeert family. Even though the official name is still Libeco-Lagae, the company started using Libeco as single brand from 2013 on.

== Activities ==
Libeco is specialized in weaving linen and fabrics mixed with linen. The fabrics have many applications:

- Upholstery
- Canvas
- Apparel
- Flax composite
- Interior design
- Household linen

Next to fabrics, the company also produces a collection of finish retail products from its fabrics. These are sold under the Libeco Home brand.

=== Belgian Linen ===
Libeco is one of the few companies that are allowed to carry the Belgian Linen label on their products.
