= Vlaams Economisch Verbond =

- Abbreviation: VEV
- Formation: 1908 (as Vlaamsch Handelsverbond)
- Type: Lobbying group
- Headquarters: Flanders, Belgium
- Members: Over 17,000 businesses (as Voka-Alliance)
- Key people: René De Feyter (managing director 1971-1993)
- Affiliations: Voka-Alliance (since 2004)
- Formerly called: Vlaamsch Handelsverbond

The Vlaams Economisch Verbond (VEV) is a Flemish employers' organization and lobbying group.

The main objectives of the organization were the development of the Flemish economy and to improve the status of Flemish as a business language in Flanders. It is an important partner of the Flemish government on business in Flanders, and also participates in the Socio-economic Council of Flanders.

== History ==
It was founded in 1908, by among others Lieven Gevaert as the Vlaamsch Handelsverbond, to create a Flemish counterpart of the Federation of Belgian Enterprises, and it became the VEV in 1926.

From 1971 to 1993, René De Feyter was the managing director of the VEV.

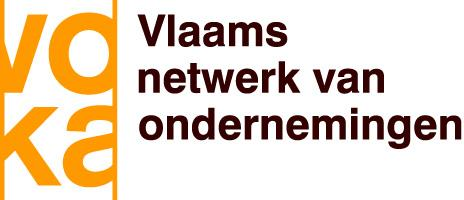
Voka (Employers organization) logo

In 2004, VEV formed an alliance with the Flemish Chambers of Commerce and Industry (CCI's) to create Voka (Employers organization). Today, there are still eight Voka - Chambers of Commerce and Industry (CCI) in Flanders (West Flanders, East Flanders, Antwerp-Waasland, Kempen, Mechelen, Halle-Vilvoorde, Leuven and Limburg). Together with the VEV, these eight CCI's form the Voka-Alliance, the largest Flemish network of enterprises.

This 'Voka-Alliance' unites more than 17,000 businesses from all sectors within the Flemish region. The alliance is politically independent; there is no structural funding from government. It is a non-profit organisation: small, medium and large-sized companies of all sectors everywhere in Flanders can become members on a voluntary basis.

== See also ==
- Agoria
- Brussels Enterprises Commerce and Industry (BECI)
- De Warande (Club)
- Economy of Belgium
- Flanders Investment and Trade (FIT)
- League of Christian Employers
- UEAPME
- UNIZO
- Walloon Union of Companies
- Prince Albert Fund
