= Union Wallonne des Entreprises =

The Walloon Union of Companies or Union Wallonne des Entreprises (UWE) is the Walloon employers organization.

== History ==
About 1965, when economic decentralization was becoming more pronounced in Belgium, Walloon business leaders felt the need for more organisation. The pioneers of the UWE, were, to name a few, Jules Delruelle (Prayon), George Halbart (Magotteaux), George Henry (Glaverbel), Pierre Holoffe (Asphaltco), Leon Jacques (Carrières de Quenast) Jean Lannoye (Papeteries de Genval), Jules Plaquet (Compagnie des Ciments Belges), Alfred Putzeys (Pieux Franki).

Together they decided, at the end of 1967, to invite a hundred company managers to a meeting, the result of which was to create the Walloon Union of Companies (rather than the Union of Walloon Companies), in this way allowing the many foreign companies established in the Walloon Area to join the organization. It is also decided to open the organization to both the industrial and non-industrial sectors. The FEB (Federation of the Companies of Belgium) had not been established at that point and the national organization was based on a Federation of the Industrialists of Belgium and a Federation of the non-industrial companies of Belgium.

Following this first meeting, it was decided to set up a Board of Directors and gather some initial funding. The new organization was founded on 2 April 1968. The first general meeting, in 1969, took place at the Charleroi Institute of Glass.

== Sources ==
- Union Wallonne des Entreprises

== See also ==
- Brussels Enterprises Commerce and Industry
- VOKA
- Economy of Belgium
- Science and technology in Wallonia
- Agoria
- UNIZO
- Cercle de Lorraine
- Prince Albert Fund
