= René De Feyter =

Belgian politician

René De Feyter (1930 – 23 March 2011) was a Belgian politician, the managing director of the VEV from 1971 to 1993.

== Biography ==
From 1956 to 1960, René de Feyter worked as a state official in Belgian Congo. In 1961, he started to work on the development project of the Port of Antwerp.

In 1968, he launched the financial newspapers De Tijd, and remained publishing director for 3 years.

From 1971 to 1993, René de Feyter was the managing director of the VEV, and the first director of the VEV's history. He was known for defying the Belgian economics establishment. In 1972, he lobbied for the implementation of Regional Economic Councils in the Flanders regions.

From 1993 to 2000, he was chairman of the board of directors of De Tijd.

He died on 23 March, 2011 at the age of 81.
