= Brussels Enterprises Commerce and Industry =

BECI - Brussels Enterprises Commerce & Industry
- Founded: 2007
- Headquarters: Louise Avenue 500, Brussels, Belgium
- Key people: Marc Decorette (Chairman), Olivier Willocx (CEO), Joëlle Evenepoel (Secretary General)
- Website: www.beci.be

The Brussels Enterprises Commerce and Industry is a private independent organisation composed of the Chamber of Commerce founded in 1703 and the Brussels Business Federation.

BECI represents and defends the interests of over 35 000 Brussels companies, small and big alike, and provides a large number of services, ranging from administrative and legal advice to third-party support.

BECI's role is also to represent the voices of its members in public discussions and with its institutional partners. BECI is represented is in most public organisations (Hub Brussels, Brussels Harbour, Citydev, Actiris, Brussels Formation, and in the most Business Centers).

BECI’s services include advice from experts and members, a large internal network of potential clients, buyers and investors, training sessions specifically designed for startups, and masterclasses in law, digital marketing, finances, human resources, strategy...

BECI follows the progress of startups on an individual basis with weekly workshops. The meetings support startups through each stage of their development: from the initial project to the funding stage, including the steps in between, such as finding the right partners and clients and establishing a social status. BECI strengthens those workshops with monthly meetings which bring together BECI member startups around themed discussions and practical workshops.

BECI especially supports and helps startups with their business development in Europe and worldwide. As Brussels is a bilingual city (French and Dutch) in which business people largely also master English, the use of a variety of languages offers easier access to the local community of entrepreneurs and greater visibility to startup founders via the content that they produce and push on their websites, blogs, newsletters, magazines and podcasts.

BECI is also an “enterprise counter” which has the largest experience with foreigners.

== See also ==
- Federation of Belgian Enterprises
- VOKA
- Walloon Union of Companies
- Science and technology in the Brussels-Capital Region
- Brussels Regional Investment Company
- Prince Albert Fund

== Sources ==
- Brussels Enterprises Commerce and Industry (French)
- BECI (French)
