= Agoria =

Belgian company

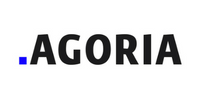
- Logo of Agoria
- Established: 1946
- Professional title: Agoria
- Headquarters: Rue Ravensteinstraat 4, 1000 Brussels
- Location: Brussels
- Region served: BEL
- Services: Expertise, Business Development, Lobby
- Members: > 2000 technology inspired companies
- Board of directors: Lode Peeters, President, Bart Steukers, CEO
- Website: www.agoria.be
- representing 320,000 employees

Agoria, previously known as Fabrimetal, is a Belgian employers' organization and member of the Federation of Belgian Enterprises.

== Description ==
Agoria connects over 1900 technologically inspired companies active in Belgium (2019) that strive for progress based on the development or application of innovations. Their goal is to increase the success of their member companies and assure their environmental sustainability.

== History ==
Fabrimetal, short for the Federation of Enterprises in the Metal Industry (Dutch: Federatie van de ondernemingen der metaalwerkende nijverheid, French: Fédération des entreprises de l'industrie des fabrications métalliques, Fabrimétal), was established in 1946 on the foundations of the Federation of Manufacturers (Dutch: Federatie van Fabrikanten, French: Fédération des constructeurs), founded in 1906. At its peak, Fabrimetal represented 1200 enterprises in the metalworking industry, electronic construction and the processing of plastics.

The name change from Fabrimetal to Agoria was announced on 9 November 2000 by then managing director Philippe de Buck and president John Cordier. The old name was thought to refer too explicitly to the metalworking industry, and it was the organisation's aim to recruit new companies from the technology sector.

Currently, Agoria counts more than 1900 member companies from the manufacturing industry, and the digital and telecom sectors. With a €125.20 billion turnover in 2018, these sectors jointly represent no less than 9% of the added value of the private sector in Belgium. Agoria's member companies represent an overall 320,000 direct jobs, about 10% of the Belgian private sector. Agoria is the largest federation within the Federation of Belgian Enterprises (Dutch: Verbond van Belgische Ondernemingen, VBO, French: Fédération des Entreprises de Belgique, FEB).

== Structure ==
Agoria is directed by Belgian companies. Current chair of the board of directors is René Branders. Agoria is divided into one department for each of the three Belgian Regions.

Period	President
Fabrimetal
1946–1952	Léon-Antoine Bekaert
1953–1965	Félix Leblanc
1965–1971	Georges Moens de Fernig
1971–1977	Marc Verhaeghe de Naeyer
1977–1983	Philippe Saverys
1983–1989	Eugène Van Dyck
1989–1993	Richard Gandibleux
1993–1999	Karel Vinck
1997–1999	Julien De Wilde
1999–2000	John Cordier
Agoria
2000–2002	John Cordier
2002–2007	Thomas Leysen
2007–2008	Francis Verheughe
2009–2010	Paul Depuydt
2010–2016	Christ'l Joris
2016–2019	Marc De Groote
2019 – present	René Branders

Period	CEO
Fabrimetal
1971–1987	Jacques De Staercke
1987–2000	Philippe de Buck van Overstraeten
Agoria
2000–2001	Philippe de Buck van Overstraeten
2001–2013	Paul Soete
2013 – present	Marc Lambotte

== Activities ==
Connect all who are inspired by technology

Agoria connects its members within company groups and provides the appropriate conditions for technological developments.

Agoria plays an important role in raising awareness of and the adoption of technological innovations: from the development of Artificial Intelligence and drones to cybersecurity. The organisation helps its member companies to discover and implement innovative technologies, to benchmark their own innovation capacity in comparison to similar companies, and to innovate in their product and services range.

Agoria sets up ecosystems to expedite innovation and to provide a framework of regulations. Smart cities, smart buildings, smart mobility, smart energy and smart health are just a few examples of such ecosystems.

Increasing the success of companies

- Operational consultation services based on business knowledge

Agoria experts provide consultation services to member companies on any aspect of their operations. Members are kept up-to-date on the trends within the industry and have access to an extensive library of useful documents, tools and templates.

- A broad network that opens doors

With frequent networking activities, Agoria assists member companies in continuing their growth. The company brings companies from various fields together to strengthen each other by sharing knowledge and exchanging experience. This network is active within Belgium and as well as internationally, in six technology clubs, each of which deals with a specific market. Networking activities include themed seminars that connect commercial partners based on technology requirements and investment opportunities.

- Ready for the digital future

Seven specific transformation pathways ensure that manufacturers become more economically sustainable and at the same time ensure a stable local economy and employment opportunities. Companies that successfully implement these transformations receive the Factory of the Future award from Agoria and Sirris. In 2018, these Factories of the Future invested more than half a billion euros and employed 11% more people.

- Crafting a sustainable future

Agoria represents the interests of member companies to the relevant decision makers on a local, regional, federal, European and international level. The objective is to provide a favourable climate for technological development and remove obstacles which limit the economic or social potential of its members.

Policy representation

Agoria represents the positions of its members and the interests of the technology sector at every level of policy. Through the Federation of Enterprises in Belgium, the organisation influences matters such as interprofessional agreements, Digital Service Tax and the National Social Security Office. At a regional level, Agoria encourages government investments: support for Walloon companies striving to decrease their CO_{2} emissions, investment in new training centres in Brussels, promotion of artificial intelligence and cybersecurity in Flanders, etc. At a European level, the organisation sits on more than 40 European committees and is a member of Business Europe.

== See also ==
=== Technology clusters in Flanders ===
- Flanders DRIVE
- Flanders Institute for Logistics (VIL)
- Interuniversity Microelectronics Centre (IMEC)
- Interdisciplinary institute for BroadBand Technology (IBBT)
- Flanders Interuniversity Institute of Biotechnology (VIB)

=== Industry and technology in Belgium ===
- Science and technology in Belgium
- Science and technology in the Brussels-Capital Region
- Science and technology in Flanders
- Science and technology in Wallonia
- Science Parks of Wallonia
- Federation of Belgian Enterprises (VBO)
- Fedustria
- Flemish Aerospace Group (FLAG)
- GIMV
- List of Belgian companies
- National Fund for Scientific Research
- SIRRIS
- VOKA
- Walloon Union of Companies
