= Sirris =

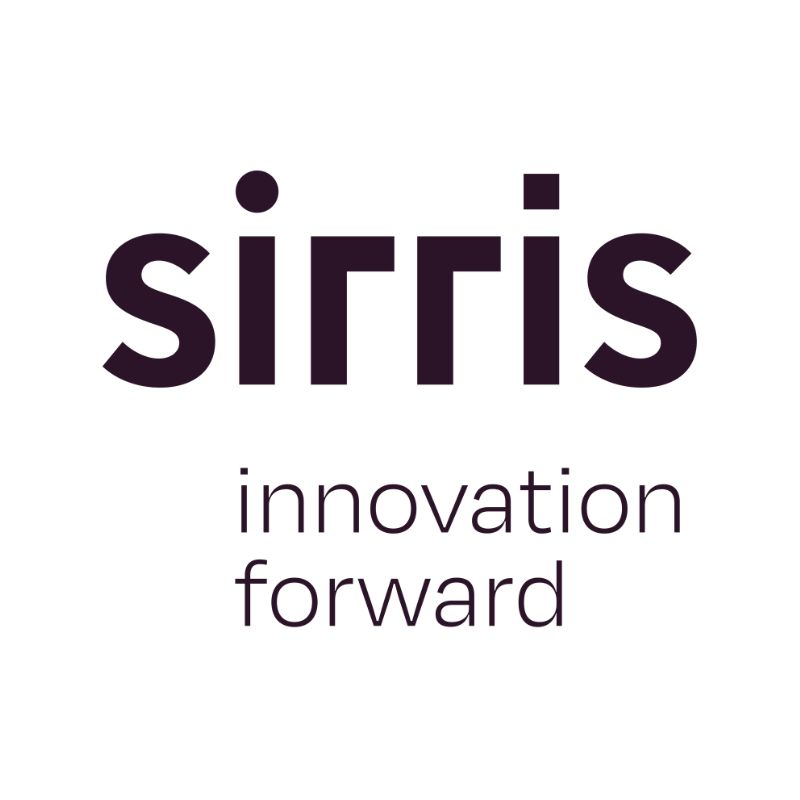

Sirris is a non-profit scientific organisation in Belgium. It is an important collaborative centre for the Belgian technology industry. Until 2007, Sirris was known as CRIF-WTCM, which was founded in 1949 by Fabrimetal (now known as Agoria, the Belgian federation of technology industries).

== Mission ==
The mission of Sirris is to support its members and clients in order to increase their competitive position on the international market through technological innovation. The organization carries out applied research and development in close cooperation with industry. Sirris participates in development projects at different levels, from European Framework Programmes for Research and Technological Development to regional ones.

== COPTURN ==
One of the biggest achievements of Sirris so far is the Cutting Optimisation Program, or COPTURN for short. It is a software package that is used to calculate the optimal cutting conditions, the program then calculates the job time and cost.

== Development fields ==
=== Additive manufacturing ===
Sirris performs researches on mains additive manufacturing technologies such as selective laser melting, 3D printing, laser cladding, stereolithography, selective laser sintering, Aero Jet Printing and paste polymerization (ceramic + polymer). All these technologies start from a CAD file to build it in metal, polymer or ceramic. In November 2019, Sirris inaugurates an additive production line demonstrator combining design and production processes by additive manufacturing and principles and processes 4.0.

=== Product Development Hub ===
In 2018, Sirris invested 850,000 euros in a new infrastructure focused on three areas: light products, miniaturisation and product connectivity in order to enable companies to enable prototyping quickly for industrialization.

== See also ==
- Agoria
- National Fund for Scientific Research
