= Federation of Belgian Enterprises =

The Federation of Enterprises in Belgium (Dutch: Verbond van Belgische Ondernemingen, VBO, French: Fédération des Entreprises de Belgique, FEB) is the only Belgian non-profit organization representing companies in all three regions of Belgium. Its members, the different Belgian sectorial employers' organizations, represent companies in key industrial and service sectors. All in all, it represents more than 30,000 businesses, of which 25,000 are small or medium-sized enterprises. Since May 2012, Pieter Timmermans has been CEO , and since March 2026, Jan Vander Stichele has been president.

The VBO/FEB aims to help create jobs for the future and ensure that these jobs complement each other, especially in the service, industrial and construction sectors. In terms of jobs, the VBO/FEB represents approximately 1.5 million workers in the private sector.

== History ==
It was founded in 1973 after a merger of the Federation of Belgian Industries and the Federation of Non Industrial Enterprises of Belgium. The VBO/FEB is the voice of business in Belgium. It aims to: work towards creating an optimum business environment, promote business interests at federal, European and international level (in 150 bodies) and to ensure consistency in the message entrepreneurs deliver and the actions they take.

== Regional federations ==
- BECI (Brussels Enterprises Commerce and Industry)
- VOKA (Vlaams Economisch Verbond)
- Walloon Union of Companies (UWE)

== See also ==
- Agoria
- Cercle de Lorraine
- Cercle Gaulois
- De Warande (Club)
- Economy of Belgium
- European Business Summit
- Fedustria
- League of Christian Employers (VKW)
- Mouvement des Entreprises de France
- Prince Albert Fund
- Science and technology in Belgium
- Union of Industrial and Employers' Confederations of Europe
- UNIZO
