= European Association of Craft, Small and Medium-Sized Enterprises =

The European Association of Craft, Small and Medium-Sized Enterprises or SMEunited (formerly UEAPME) is an umbrella group for associations of SMEs based in Brussels, Belgium. SMEunited represents the interests of European crafts, trades and SMEs at EU level. Its 67 member organisations from 34 European countries consist of national cross-sectorial SME federations, European branch federations and other associate members. Its members combined represent more than 12 million enterprises, which employ around 50 million people across Europe. SMEunited is a recognised European Social Partner.

== History ==
UEAPME was founded in 1980. The first headquarters of the association were in Munich, Germany. After some years in Germany, the organisation moved its headquarters to Brussels, Belgium, where it was established in 1991 as an international not for profit association under Belgian law (AISBL). The acronym UEAPME was made official in this incorporation and stands for “Union Européenne de l’Artisanat et des Petites et Moyennes Enterprises”, i.e. the European Union of Crafts and Small and Medium-sized Enterprises. In February 2019, the name was changed to SMEunited.

The aims of SMEunited as written in its statutes are as follows:

- Monitoring the EU policy and legislative process and keeping its members informed on all matters of European Union policy of relevance to crafts, trades and SMEs;
- Representing and promoting the interests, needs and opinions of its member organisations to the EU institutions and other international organisations;
- Supporting its members academically, technically and legally on all areas of EU policy;
- Supporting the idea of European integration and contributing to European co-operation.

As of 1998, UEAPME is a European Social Partner alongside BUSINESSEUROPE (previously UNICE), the European Centre of Enterprises with Public Participation and of Enterprises of General Economic Interest (CEEP) and the European Trade Union Confederation (ETUC). In 1996, the first negotiations between UNICE, CEEP and ETUC led to the conclusion of a framework agreement on parental leave. UEAPME challenged the validity of the directive implementing the agreement before the European Court of First Instance, claiming a violation of its own right to negotiate. The complaint was dismissed in June 1998, but the court case created political momentum for the opening of discussions with UNICE, according to the principle of mutual recognition. In November of the same year, the two organisations reached an agreement, further to which UEAPME became a recognised participant in the European social dialogue.

== Structure ==
SMEunited is run by a Secretariat based in Brussels consisting of 20 staff members working in thematic directorates. The Secretariat also includes an administrative section, a press office and a Study Unit. The current President is Ulrike Rabmer-Koller, from Austria, since January 2016.

The SMEunited structure also includes a Board of Directors as well as several Committees, Working Groups and Task Forces.

== Members ==
SMEunited counts more than 67 member organisations spanning across all Member States of the EU and beyond, representing 12 million enterprises and nearly 55 million employees.

=== Full members ===
The full members of SMEunited are composed of representative national, cross-sectoral organisations representing craft activities and/or SME businesses in the different sectors of the economy within the European Union. Full members have the right to vote.

=== Associate members ===
SMEunited has three types of associate members.

- Associate members from non-EU countries: this group is composed of national associations of craft industries and of SME businesses from European countries that are not members of the European Union.
- European sectoral organisations this category is composed of European and International organisations representing SMEs in a specific trade sector.
- Other associate members this category is made of all types of institutions and organisations, which are involved in craft and/or SME activities and support the SME family.

Associate members attend and speak at SMEunited meetings, but have no voting rights.

== Main areas of activity ==
Some of the key EU legislative areas in which SMEunited is active include:

- Economic and fiscal policy (Lisbon strategy, macroeconomic policy, taxation)
- Education and vocational training (lifelong learning, recognition and transparency of qualifications)
- Employment and social affairs (European Social Dialogue, labour law, social protection, social inclusion)
- Enterprise policy (access to finance, standardisation, CSR, R&D, internationalisation of SMEs)
- Environmental policy (sustainable development, chemicals, waste policy, energy policy, climate change)
- Internal market and legal affairs (better regulation, services, consumer protection, IPR, company law, State aid, ADR, collective redress, small claims)
- Regional policy and structural funds
- Sectoral policies (construction, healthcare, foodstuffs, retail, tourism, transport)
