= King Baudouin Foundation =

Foundation based in Brussels, Belgium

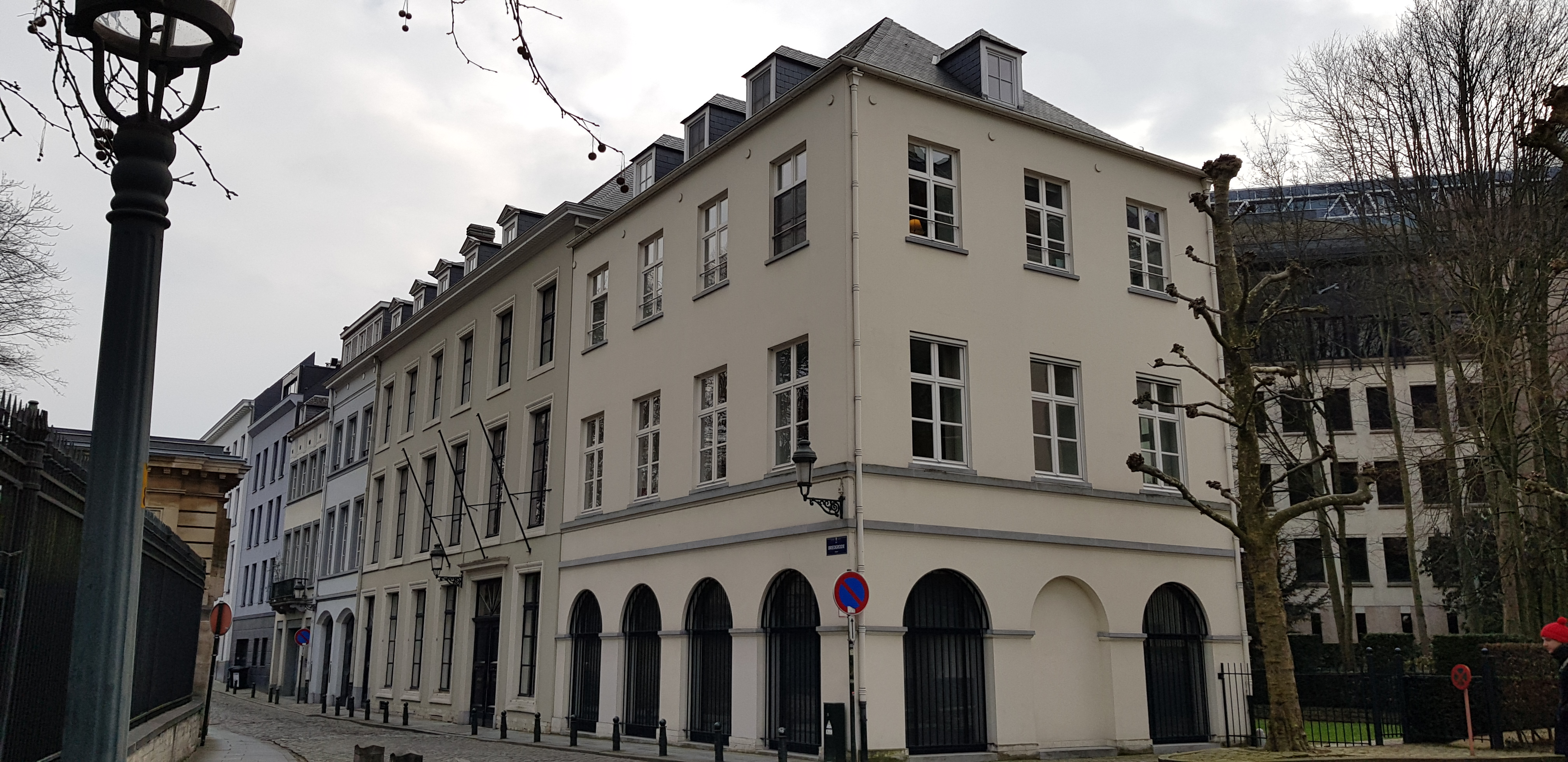
Building King Baudouin Foundation

The King Baudouin Foundation (KBF) (Dutch: Koning Boudewijnstichting, KBS; French: Fondation Roi-Baudouin) is a foundation based in Brussels (Belgium). It seeks to change society for the better and invests in inspiring projects and individuals.

The Foundation was set up in 1976, on the occasion of the 25th anniversary of King Baudouin's accession to the throne, and has been under the honorary Presidency of Queen Mathilde since 2015.

The Foundation supports projects in Belgium and at the European and international level. To support its international goal, the KBF set up a US public charity and an office in New York City. Since 1999, the KBFUS facilitates philanthropy in the US, Europe and Africa. In 2017, KBFCanada was launched.

== Organisational structure ==
The King Baudouin Foundation Advisory Council and the Board of Governors determine the key areas of work.

The board of governors is chaired by Thomas Leysen.

The managing director is Luc Tayart de Borms, who is being succeeded by Brieuc Van Damme.

== Domains of action ==
The King Baudouin Foundation supports projects in various fields of action:

- Social justice and poverty
- Health and medicinal research
- Heritage and culture
- Social engagement
- Democracy in a changing world
- Education and development of talents
- Europe and international (Africa, South America, Asia)
- Climate, the environment and biodiversity

In 2021, the King Baudouin Foundation and the Funds it administers provided 132.541.857 euro in support to 1.448 individuals and 3.508 organizations. KBF also organises debates on important social issues, shares research results through free publications, enters into partnerships, and encourages philanthropy, in Belgium, in Europe and at the international level.

As of data covering grants in 2024/2025, The KBF is the 9th most generous philanthropic foundation in Europe. In 2025, the KBF supported more than 7000 organisations; with €25 million targeted at projects aiming to improve social justice and wellbeing.

=== Ukraine Aid ===
Following the start of the Russian invasion of Ukraine, the King Baudouin Foundation provided support to Ukraine through the Caritas International network. In 2022, the King Baudouin Foundation provided €1.23 million for Caritas Ukraine, a Ukrainian Catholic not-for-profit and humanitarian relief organisation.

In 2022, the foundation supported Ukrainian researchers whose work has been disrupted by the war, providing scholarships for research in the European Union (in cooperation with European Policy Centre).

In 2023, the King Baudouin Foundation, in partnership with the Schréder Together fund, supported the reconstruction of Borodianka, a Ukrainian town heavily damaged by the Russian invasion. The initiative included developing a city lighting plan and installing over 100 energy-efficient street lights.

== See also ==
- Rousseeuw Prize for Statistics
- Prince Albert Fund
