= Bekaert =

Steel wire company in Belgium

NV Bekaert SA
- Type: Naamloze vennootschap / Société anonyme
- Traded as: Euronext Brussels: BEKB
- ISIN: BE0974258874
- Industry: Manufacturing
- Founded: Zwevegem, Belgium (1880)
- Headquarters: Zwevegem, Belgium
- Key people: Yves Kerstens (CEO); Jürgen Tinggren (chairman)
- Products: Steel wire, steel cord
- Brands: Dramix; Motto; Gaucho
- Revenue: €5 billion (2019)
- Number of employees: 28,000 (mid 2020)
- Website: bekaert.com

N.V. Bekaert S.A. (Euronext Brussels: BEKB) is a global company with headquarters in Belgium, employing 28,000 people worldwide. Its primary business is steel wire transformation and coatings. Operating in 45 countries, Bekaert generated combined sales of €5.1 billion in 2019.

== Organisation ==
=== Board ===
The Board of Directors is the company's supreme decision-making body in all matters other than those, in respect of which decision-making powers are reserved to the General Meeting of Shareholders by law or the articles of association. The Board of Directors delegates its management and operational authority to the Bekaert Group Executive. The main task of the Board is to determine the company's general policy and supervise its activities.

The Board of Directors has 10 members:

1. Jürgen Tinggren (Chairman of the Board of Directors)
2. Yves Kerstens (Chief Executive Officer)
3. Henriette Fenger Ellekrog
4. Christophe Jacobs van Merlen
5. Maxime Parmentier
6. Eriikka Söderström
7. Caroline Storme
8. Emilie van de Walle de Ghelcke
9. Henri Jean Velge
10. Mei Ye

== Acquisitions ==
In 2015, Bekaert acquired Pirelli's steel cord business and will supply steel cord to Pirelli for years to come. Steel cord provides strength to the rubber car tire. This was the largest acquisition in Bekaert's history, adding approximately 300 million euros per year to consolidated sales.

In January 2026, it was announced that Bekaert had agreed to acquire Bridgestone’s tyre reinforcement business in China and Thailand for €60 million. The transaction, which includes two manufacturing facilities, is expected to close in the first half of 2026 subject to regulatory approvals.
