= Prince Albert Fund =

Belgian non-profit organization

- Abbreviation: PAF
- Formation: 1984
- Type: Foundation, Fund
- Purpose: International Leadership
- Headquarters: King Baudouin Foundation
- Location: Brussels (Belgium)
- Patronnage: Princess Astrid of Belgium
- Affiliations: Federation of Belgian Enterprises & King Baudouin Foundation
- Website: https://www.princealbertfund.be/

The Prince Albert Fund is a Belgian non-profit organization (fund) which provides a scholarship to young Belgian professionals to give them the opportunity to carry out a project for a Belgian company in international business development, outside Europe. The fund was founded by the King Baudouin Foundation, the VBO-FEB, and the office of His Majesty King Albert II. Today, the fund is directed by a steering committee consisting of alumni of the Fund and representatives of FEB-VBO, VOKA, UWE and BECI.

== The scholarship ==
Each year, about 20 to 30 young people are selected out of hundreds of applications through a rigorous selection process in different rounds. The requirements that the Fund sets for candidates are very high; several diplomas (at least a cum laude Master's degree) or work placements abroad are recommended, while the candidate must be able to speak two or three languages fluently. Candidates must be under 30 years at the time of the application and have Belgian nationality. Since candidates also need to have at least 3 years of working experience the program is not a traineeship and can be seen as an alternative for an MBA. During the application process attention is also paid to character, motivation, general knowledge, and knowledge of Belgian foreign trade. The candidates are chosen by a selection committee made up of alumni of the fund and experts in international trade and human resources.

The Prince Albert Fund offers a 12-month scholarship. The grant includes one month of preparation in Belgium and 11 months of work experience abroad (outside Western Europe). Before their departure, the fellows take part in an intercultural training program developed especially for the Fund.

The Prince Albert Fund has a total of 464 alumni. Some 200 Belgian companies (ranging from small start-ups to well-established businesses) have enabled these young people to experience part of their commercial development abroad. Some realised projects are; the establishment of a distribution center in India for Greenyard, the set-up of a direct distribution channel in China for Unilin (Mohawk Industries), the management of an excellence project for UCB in the APAC region, M&A support for Ageas in Hong-Kong, market research for AGC Glass in West-Africa, start-up of an overseas office for Unifly in New York, the development of reporting standards for Korys investment company in Brazil,...

At the end of the project, the fellow has to report on his project to the selection committee of the Fund. If the selection committee gives a positive opinion, the management committee will award him/her the title of 'Laureate of the Fund' during an academic session in the presence of a member of the Belgian royal family at the BELvue Museum. The best project is awarded the McKinsey award for excellence.

== History ==
The Fund was created in 1984 by the Federation of Belgian Enterprises and by the King Baudouin Foundation on the occasion of the 50th birthday of His Royal Highness Prince Albert of Belgium, later to become the sixth King of the Belgians. The Fund's aim was to embody the vision of a group of captains of industries to promote Belgian business abroad.

Since its creation, the Prince Albert Fund has enabled over 550 young Belgian professionals to develop skills and gain experience in international business and helped over 300 Belgian companies promote their products and services outside Europe.

In 2014 Chris Burggraeve (marketeer and professor at the TRIUM EMBA) was nominated President of the Management Committee of the Fund, succeeding captain of industry Julien De Wilde. The current president is Emmanuel Caeymaex, VP Immunology UCB & alumni himself.

On 2 April 2015, the Prince Albert Fund celebrated its 30th anniversary. At this occasion, King Albert handed over the reins of the fund to his daughter Princess Astrid of Belgium.

== See also ==
- King Baudouin Foundation
- Olivaint Conference of Belgium
- Belgian American Educational Foundation
