= Luc Sels =

Belgian sociologist

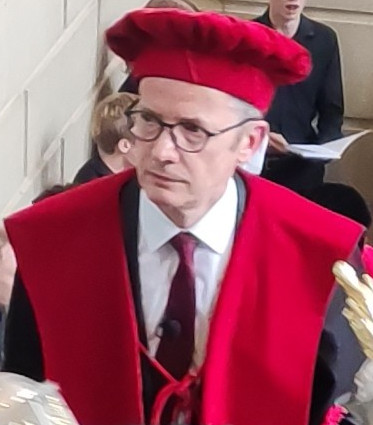
- Sels in 2023

President of Leiden University
- Incumbent
- Assumed office 1 November 2025
- Preceded by: Annetje Ottow

Rector of KU Leuven
- In office 1 August 2017 – 1 August 2025
- Preceded by: Rik Torfs
- Succeeded by: Séverine Vermeire

Personal details
- Born: 1967 (age 58–59) Merksem, Belgium
- Education: Katholieke Universiteit Leuven
- Profession: Professor of Work and Organisation Studies
- Website: www.lucsels.be

Luc Sels (born 1967 in Merksem) is a Belgian sociologist who has served as the president of Leiden University since 1 November 2025. Previously, he served as rector of KU Leuven from August 2017 to August 2025.

== Early life and education ==
Luc Sels obtained a master's degree in Sociology of KU Leuven summa cum laude in 1989. From 1989 till 1990 he was a researcher at the Research Institute for Work and Society (HIVA). From 1990 till 1995 he worked with a Doctoral grant National Fund for Scientific Research. He obtained a Ph.D. in Social Sciences in 1995. In 1996 he was awarded the triennial 'Joseph Merlot - Joseph Leclercq' award, granted by the Centre International de Recherches et d'Information sur l'Economie Publique, Sociale et Coopérative (CIRIEC), for his doctoral thesis "De overheid viert de teugels".

== Academic career ==
He became a project manager at HIVA in 1995 and Professor at the Department of Applied Economics in 1996. From 2004 on he is Full Professor at the Faculty of Economics and Business of KU Leuven. As of 2010 he is part-time professor in the Rochester-Bern Executive MBA Program at the Simon Business School of the University of Rochester. The program is organised in Bern, Switzerland in conjunction with the Institut für Finanzmanagement at the Universität Bern. From 2011 on he is research fellow at the Vlerick Business School and from 2015 till 2020 Honorary Professor of Cardiff University (Cardiff Business School).

He researches in the Department of Work and Organisation Studies. Primary research interests are estimates and projections of labour market indictors (e.g. employment-to-population ratio, labour turnover, replacement demand, occupational projections), active ageing, strategic human resource planning and talent management. He published in scholarly journals such as Journal of Management, Journal of Management Studies, Journal of Applied Psychology, Journal of Organizational Behavior, Human Relations and Labour Economics.

=== Rector of KU Leuven ===
Sels was the rector of the KU Leuven from August 2017 to August 2025. Sels won the elections for new rector in the first round on Tuesday 9 May 2017 by beating Rik Torfs with 51.12% to 48.88%. Before becoming rector, he was dean of the Faculty of Economics and Business from 2009 till 2017. On 11 May 2021 Sels got reelected as rector with 64% of the votes against 33% for his challenger, toxicologist Jan Tytgat. He was succeeded by the first female rector in the history of KU Leuven, Séverine Vermeire, on 1 August 2025.

According to some students organisations, and several lecturers he did not take up his responsibilities when Sanda Dia, a KU Leuven student died during a hazing ritual by Reuzegom in 2018.

=== President of Leiden University ===
In September 2025, the Executive Board of Leiden University announced Sels as the president of the university, replacing Annetje Ottow. He took up office on 1 November of the same year.

== Public role ==
Sels serves on the Belgian High Council for Employment (Hoge Raad voor de Werkgelegenheid) as a representative of the Federal Minister of Employment and is director of the Policy Research Centre for Work and Social Economy (Steunpunt Werk en Sociale Economie) that gives advice to the Flemish Government on labour market policies. He is a columnist for Trends. From 1997 on he is a member of the Academy of Management (Human Resources, Careers and Organizational Behavior division).
