= Regia Mtema =

Tanzanian politician (1980–2012)

Regia Estelatus Mtema (1980-2012) was a Tanzanian politician. She was a Special Seats Member of Parliament for the Chadema party, and Shadow Minister for Labor and Employment.

== Early life and education ==
Mtema was born on 21 April 1980, the daughter of Estelatus Mtema. She attended Forodhani Secondary School in Dar es Salaam before going on to Machame Girls Secondary School for advanced secondary education. She graduated with a Bachelor of Science degree in home economics and human nutrition from the Sokoine University of Agriculture.

== Career ==
A disabled woman, Mtema was active in the Tanzania Federation for People with Disabilities, representing them at a 2008 workshop. She was also a senior official in Chadema’s Directorate of Youth Affairs.

== Death ==
Mtema died in a car accident on 14 January 2012. She was buried at Ifakara, Kilombero District in Morogoro Region.
