= Acid (YouTuber) =

Belgian YouTuber

Nathan Vandergunst
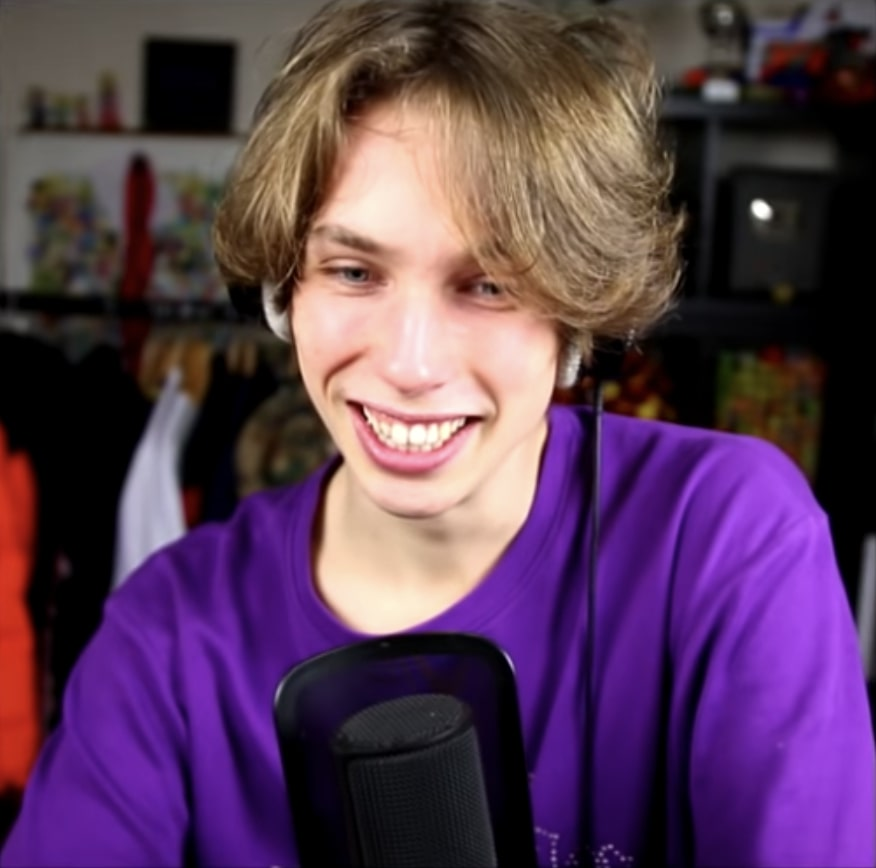
- Vandergunst in 2019
- Born: 29 June 1999 (age 27)
- Other name: Acid
- Occupation: YouTuber

YouTube information
- Channels: ACID2
- Years active: 2013-present
- Subscribers: 1.08 million (combined)
- Views: 269 million (combined)
- Last updated: 24 August 2024

Nathan Vandergunst (born 29 June 1999), known professionally as Acid (pronounced /ˈeɪsɪd/), is a Belgian YouTuber. He started his YouTube channel at the age of 13 in January 2013. He lives in Blankenberge, a seaside city in the Belgian province of West Flanders. He makes videos in Dutch.

== Biography ==
Vandergunst began posting videos on the video platform YouTube, mainly videos about the third-person shooter game Qpang. At the age of 13, he started his channel "YaDsAcid", which is also the name visible on his Twitch channel. He reportedly named his channel after the character "Acid Burn" from the 1995 film Hackers.

Since the start of his career, Vandergunst has had a majority Dutch audience. In order to make his videos understandable for all his viewers, he taught himself to speak Standard Dutch. As a result, his accent on the internet is considered a blend of Flemish and Dutch.

In late 2021, he released the single "Go, Acid!" together with Joost Klein and Apson, which was his debut single. The song spent 3 weeks in the Flemish Ultratop 50 charts, peaking at position 41.

== Controversy ==
In June 2023, Acid sparked controversy by publishing a YouTube video that revealed the names, photographs, and occupations of certain members of the Reuzegom student club. Just days earlier, several Reuzegom members had been convicted by a Belgian court for their involvement in the 2018 death of fellow student Sanda Dia during a hazing ritual. However, Acid argued that the sentences handed down were too lenient.

Subsequently, Acid was sued in criminal court by former Reuzegom chairman Donald de Vinck de Winnezeele and NV DIMA, the holding company for his parents' restaurant, for harassment, slander, libel, defamation, discrimination and cyberbullying. The catalyst was Acid's accusation that the restaurant owner's son was partly responsible for Dia's death, accompanied by a flood of negative fake reviews and false reservations targeting the family's restaurant.

In February 2024, Acid was found guilty of electronic harassment. He was sentenced to a fine, provisional damages, and a three-month suspended prison sentence. Acid did not appeal his conviction. He started a crowdfunding campaign to cover the fines, damages, and legal costs, raising €160,000 within a few days. He committed to donate any surplus funds to the Sanda Dia Foundation, established by Sanda's father, Ousmane.
