= Martin Moors =

Martin Moors is a professor of Philosophy and is the Chair of Contemporary Metaphysics at the Higher Institute of Philosophy at the Catholic University of Leuven (KUL), Belgium, where he lectures.

He has published work on Kant, German idealism and Schelling.

== Books ==
Boros, Gábor, Herman De Dijn, and M. Moors. The Concept of Love in 17th and 18th Century Philosophy. [Leuven, Belgium]: Leuven University Press, 2007.
