= Selg =

Family name

Selg is a surname. Notable people with the surname include:

- Hanno Selg (1932–2019), Estonian modern pentathlete
- Peter Selg (born 1963), German psychiatrist

== See also ==
- 18565 Selg, minor planet
- Sels
