= Jus remonstrandi =

Catholic Church canon law right

In the canon law of the Catholic Church, jus remonstrandi (Latin for "right of objection") is the legal right to protest a Papal bull, edict, or law. The right is usually only provided to a Catholic bishop or other high ecclesiastical official.

== Contemporary exercise ==
In 1994, Belgian politician and canonist Rik Torfs appealed to bishops to exercise their jus remonstrandi to protest the Papal letter Ordinatio sacerdotalis, which ended the debate on ordination of women to the Catholic priesthood.
