= Gerald Misinzo =

Tanzanian professor

- Born: 2 January 1975; Sengerema, Tanzania

Academic background
- Education: Sokoine University of Agriculture (Bachelor of Veterinary Medicine); Katholieke Universiteit Leuven (Master of Science in Molecular Biology); Ghent University (Doctor of Philosophy in Veterinary Medicine)

Academic work
- Discipline: Biology
- Sub-discipline: Virology; Veterinary medicine
- Institutions: Sokoine University of Agriculture

Gerald Misinzo (born 1975) is a veterinarian. He is a professor of virology and an Oliver R Tambo Africa Research Chair for Viral Epidemics at Sokoine University of Agriculture. He leads the World Bank-designated SACIDS Africa Centre of Excellence for Infectious Diseases of Humans and Animals in Eastern and Southern Africa. Misinzo was a member of the Special COVID-19 Committee appointed by Samia Suluhu Hassan, the President of the United Republic of Tanzania.

== Early life and education ==
Gerald Misinzo was born in Sengerema, a town South of Lake Victoria on 2 January 1975. After attending local primary (Nyanzumla, Bulyaheke and Kanyelele) and secondary (ordinary level at Kilosa Agricultural Secondary School from 1988 to 1991 and advanced level at Kibaha Secondary School from 1992 to 1994) schools, he was admitted in 1995 to Sokoine University of Agriculture, in Morogoro, Tanzania, graduating with a Bachelor of Veterinary Medicine in 2000. He obtained a master's degree in Molecular Biology in 2003 from Katholieke Universiteit Leuven, in Leuven, Belgium. He received a PhD in Veterinary Medicine from Ghent University in 2007. In his PhD thesis, he studied the entry of porcine circovirus 2 and porcine reproductive and respiratory syndrome virus in their host cells.
