= KU Leuven =

Catholic research university in Belgium

- Katholieke Universiteit Leuven (Note: Dutch pronunciation: [kɑtoːˈlikə ʔynivɛrsiˈtɛit ˈløːvə(n)].)
- Latin: Universitas catholica Lovaniensis
- Other name: Katholieke Universiteit te Leuven (Note: According to the university's style guidelines (in Dutch), KU Leuven is the university's name in all languages. However, according to the university's legal sheet, the university's legal name by the law of 28 May 1970 issuing legal personality to the institution is Katholieke Universiteit te Leuven, which is used in the university's own official publications, with a variant Katholieke Universiteit Leuven according to the Flemish Community of Belgium.)
- Motto: Sedes Sapientiae (Latin)
- Motto in English: Seat of Wisdom
- Type: Publicly-funded Catholic university
- Established: 1425 as Studium Generale Lovaniense (predecessor institution); 1834 as Catholic University of Leuven (1834–1968); 1970 (split)
- Academic affiliations: CESAER; CLUSTER; Coimbra Group; EASN Association; EUA; Europaeum; EQUIS; LERU; VIU; TPC; Una Europa; Universitas 21
- Budget: €1.5 billion (operating revenue, FY 2024)
- Chairman: Marianne Thyssen
- Chancellor: Jozef De Kesel
- Rector: Severine Vermeire
- Administrative staff: 11,534
- Students: 65,534 (2023–24)
- Doctoral students: 7,440 (2023–24)
- Location: Leuven, Belgium; 50.878°N 4.700°E
- Campus: Main (urban/university town) campus in Leuven and satellite campuses in Aalst, Antwerp, Bruges, Brussels, Diepenbeek, Genk, Geel, Ghent, Kortrijk and Sint-Katelijne-Waver
- Colors: Blue and white
- Mascot: Fons Sapientiae
- Website: kuleuven.be

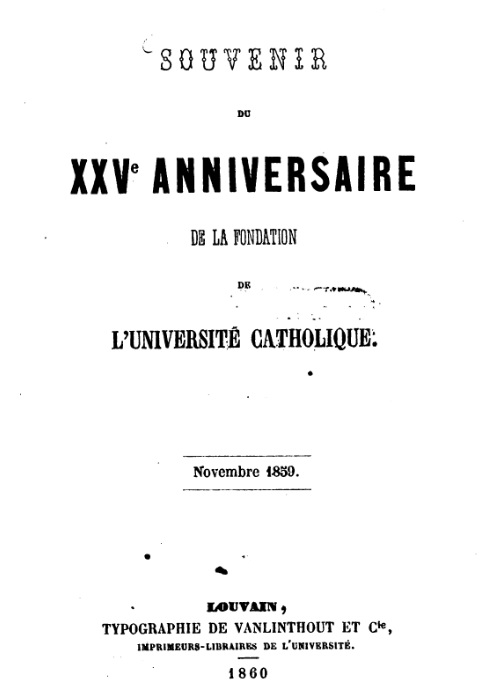
Book celebrating the 25 anniversary of the founding of the Catholic University of Louvain, November 3, 1859

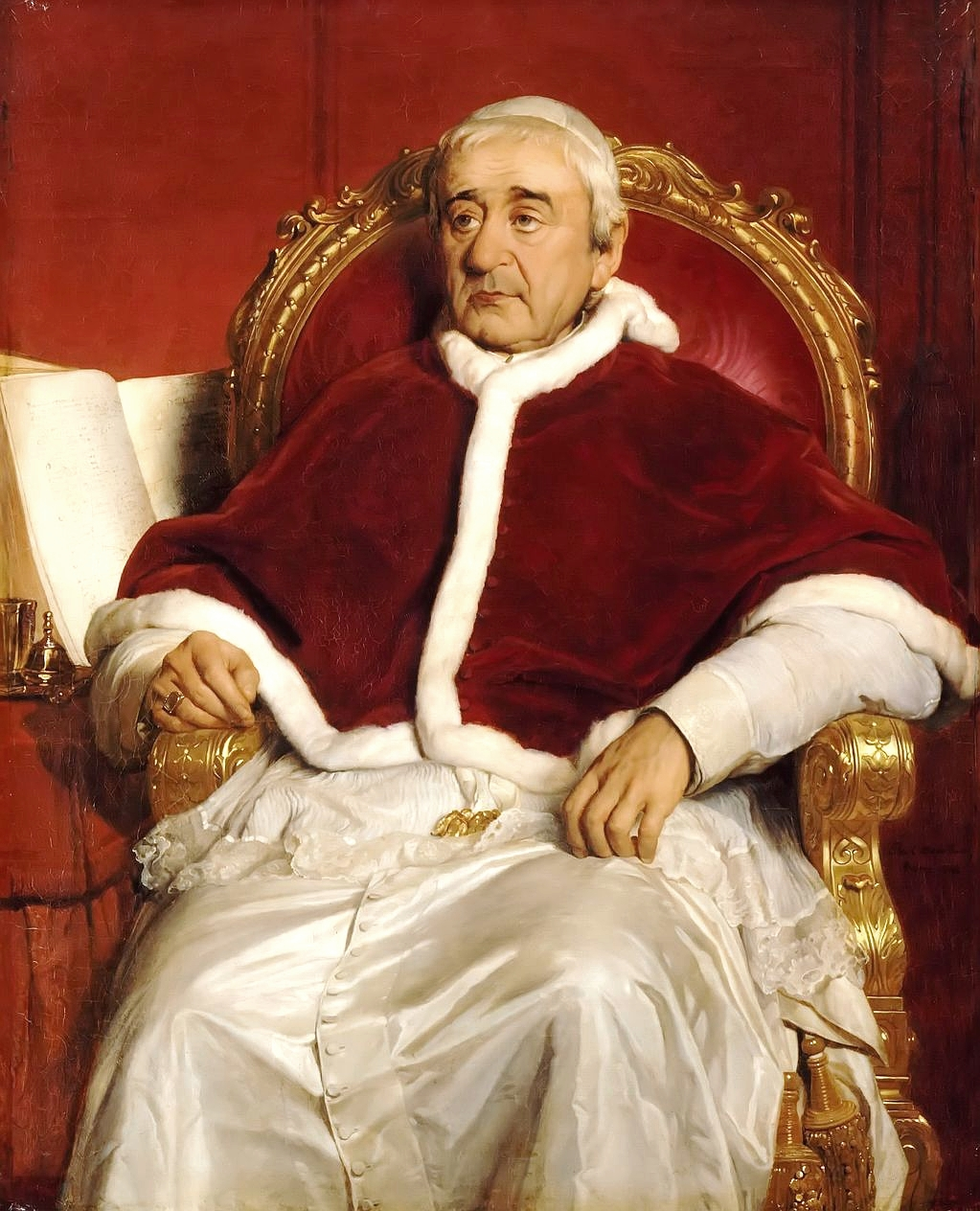
Pope Gregory XVI (1765–1846)

KU Leuven (Katholieke Universiteit Leuven) is a Catholic research university in the city of Leuven, Belgium.

In addition to its main campus in Leuven, it has satellite campuses in Kortrijk, Antwerp, Ghent, Bruges, Ostend, Geel, Diepenbeek, Genk, Aalst, Sint-Katelijne-Waver, and in Belgium's capital Brussels. KU Leuven is the largest university in Belgium and the Low Countries and the largest Dutch-language university in the world. In 2021–22, more than 65,000 students were enrolled, with 21% being international students. Its primary language of instruction is Dutch, although several programs are taught in English, particularly graduate and postgraduate degrees.

KU Leuven previously only accepted baptized Catholics, but is now open to students from different faiths or life-stances.

While nowadays only the acronymic name KU Leuven is used, the university's legal name is Katholieke Universiteit Leuven, officially Katholieke Universiteit te Leuven, which translates in English as Catholic University at Leuven. However, the acronymic name is not translated in official communications, like its similarly named French-language sister university Université catholique de Louvain (UCLouvain).

== Universities in Leuven ==
The town of Leuven has been the seat of four universities, with the first one established in 1425. Since then, the organisation has been abolished and refounded multiple times.

=== Old University of Leuven ===
The Old University of Leuven (or Studium Generale Lovaniense) was founded in 1425 by Duke John IV of Brabant, the civil authorities of Brabant, as well as the municipal administration of the city of Leuven, despite the initial opposition of the chapter of Sint-Pieter. For centuries, the university flourished due to the presence of famous scholars and professors, such as Adriaan Florenszoon Boeyens (Pope Adrian VI), Desiderius Erasmus, Johannes Molanus, Juan Luís Vives, Andreas Vesalius and Gerardus Mercator.

After the French Revolution, the university was formally integrated into the French Republic when the Holy Roman Emperor, Francis I, ceded then Austrian Netherlands to France by the Treaty of Campo Formio signed on 17 October 1797. A law dating to 1793, which mandated that all universities in France be closed, came into effect. The old University of Leuven was abolished by decree of the Département of the Dyle on October 25, 1797.

=== State University of Leuven ===
A few years after French rule came to an end, when Belgium was part of the United Kingdom of the Netherlands, king William I of the Netherlands in 1817 founded a secular university in Leuven, the State University of Leuven, where many professors of the Old University of Leuven taught. This university was abolished in 1835.

=== Catholic University ===
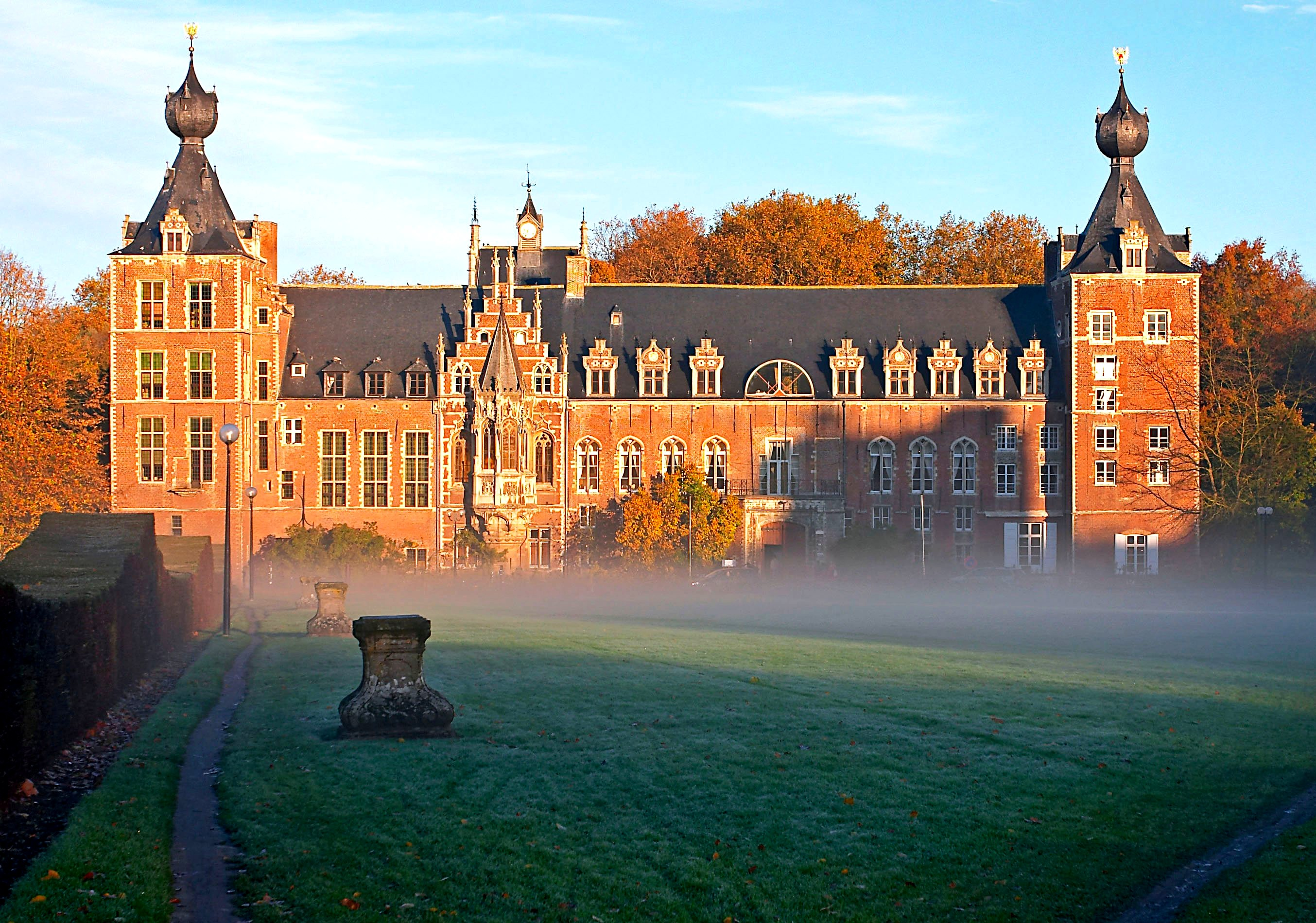
Arenberg Castle, purchased by the Catholic University of Leuven in 1921

The Catholic University of Leuven was founded in 1834 in Mechelen by the bishops of Belgium, after an official Papal Brief of Pope Gregory XVI. This new Catholic university stayed only briefly in Mechelen, as the bishops already moved the university headquarters to Leuven on 1 December 1835, where it took the name Catholic University of Leuven. This occurred after the closure of the State University of Leuven in 1835, where many professors of the Old University of Leuven had taught. KU Leuven is generally (but controversially) identified as a continuation of the older institution; controversy lays in the fact that this link to the Old University cannot be maintained from a purely juridical perspective as the Old University was suppressed under French rule. (Note: The Old University of Leuven (1425–1797) is the oldest university in the low countries, and the Catholic University of Leuven (1834) is generally, yet controversially, identified as a continuation of it. In the mid-1800s, Belgium's highest court, the Court of Cassation, ruled that the 1834 "Catholic University of Leuven" was a different institution created under a different charter and thus cannot be regarded as continuing the 1425 "University of Leuven". See also: History of the Old University of Leuven.) In its statutes, KU Leuven officially declares against the rulings of the Court of Cassation and the Cour d'Appel, to be the continuation of the Studium Generale Lovaniense established in 1425, and together with UCLouvain it sets out to celebrate its 600th anniversary in 2025. The original establishment during medieval times and subsequent re-foundation at a later period represents a fate shared by the University of Leuven (KU Leuven) with several other well-known European universities that experienced the upheavals of revolutionary times. In 1920, the Catholic University of Leuven for the first time admitted female students, lagging some 40 years behind the Belgian universities of Brussels, Liège and Ghent.

=== Present-day university ===
In 1968, tensions between the Dutch-speaking and French-speaking communities led to the splitting of the bilingual Catholic University of Leuven into two "sister" universities, with the Dutch-language university becoming a fully functioning independent institution in Leuven in 1970, and the Université catholique de Louvain departing to a newly built greenfield campus site in the French-speaking part of Belgium. KU Leuven's first rector after the split was Pieter De Somer.

In 1972, the university set up a separate entity, Leuven Research & Development (LRD), to support industrial and commercial applications of university research. It has led to numerous spin-offs, such as the technology company Metris, and manages tens of millions of euros in investments and venture capital.

The university's electronic learning environment, TOLEDO, which started in September 2001, was gradually developed into the central electronic learning environment at the KUL. The word is an acronym for TOetsen en LEren Doeltreffend Ondersteunen (English: "effectively supporting testing and learning"). It is the collective name for a number of commercial software programs and tools, such as Blackboard. The project offers the Question Mark Perception assignment software to all institution members and has implemented the Ariadne KPS to reuse digital learning objects inside the Blackboard environment.

On 11 July 2002, the KU Leuven became the dominant institution in the "KU Leuven Association" (see below).

KU Leuven is a member of the Coimbra Group (a network of leading European universities) as well as of the LERU Group (League of European Research Universities). Since November 2014, KU Leuven's Faculty of Economics and Business is accredited by European Quality Improvement System, which is a leading accreditation system specializing in higher education institutions of management and business administration. As of academic year of 2012–2013, the university held Erasmus contracts with 434 European establishments. It also had 22 central bilateral agreements in 8 countries: the United States, China, South Africa, Japan, the Democratic Republic of Congo, Vietnam, Poland, and the Netherlands. The vast majority of international EU students came from the Netherlands, while most non-EU ones come from China.

Even though the university is financially independent from the Catholic Church, representatives from the Catholic Archdiocese of Mechelen–Brussels sit on the Board of Trustees, and are yielded chairmanship powers and veto powers in certain decisions.

In December 2011, the university changed its official name to KU Leuven in all official communications and branding. While its legal name remains to be Katholieke Universiteit Leuven, the university uses its short name or acronym, KU Leuven, in all communications, including academic research publications. The long name is only used in legally binding documents such as contracts and only on the first instance, according to university's communication guidelines. According to its then rector, the change is intended as a way to emphasize its history of freedom of academic inquiry and its independence from the Church, without erasure of its Catholic heritage.

Since August 2017, the university has been led by Luc Sels who replaced former rector Rik Torfs. The Belgian archbishop, Luc Terlinden is the current Grand Chancellor and a member of the university board.

KU Leuven hosts the world's largest banana genebank, the Bioversity International Musa Germplasm Transit Centre, that celebrated its 30th anniversary in 2017 and was visited by Deputy Prime Minister and Minister for Development Cooperation, Alexander De Croo.

In 2018, a student of African origin, Sanda Dia, died during a cruel hazing ritual to enter the Reuzegom fraternity. The perpetrators, whose parents mostly belong to the upper class, are being prosecuted, but were so far only lightly sanctioned by the university authorities. As a consequence of these events, which attracted international media coverage, the institution received criticism as to how it handled the matter. In 2023, 18 students were fined 400 Euros and community service for their involvement in the death and the degrading treatment.

Historically, the Catholic University of Leuven has been a major contributor to the development of Catholic theology. The university is dedicated to Mary, the mother of Jesus, under her traditional attribute as "Seat of Wisdom", and organizes an annual celebration on 2 February in her honour. On that day, the university also awards its honorary doctorates. The neo-Gothic seal created in 1909 and used by the university shows the medieval statue Our Lady of Leuven in a vesica piscis shape. The version used by KU Leuven dates from the 1990s and features the date 1425 in Times New Roman.

== Campus ==
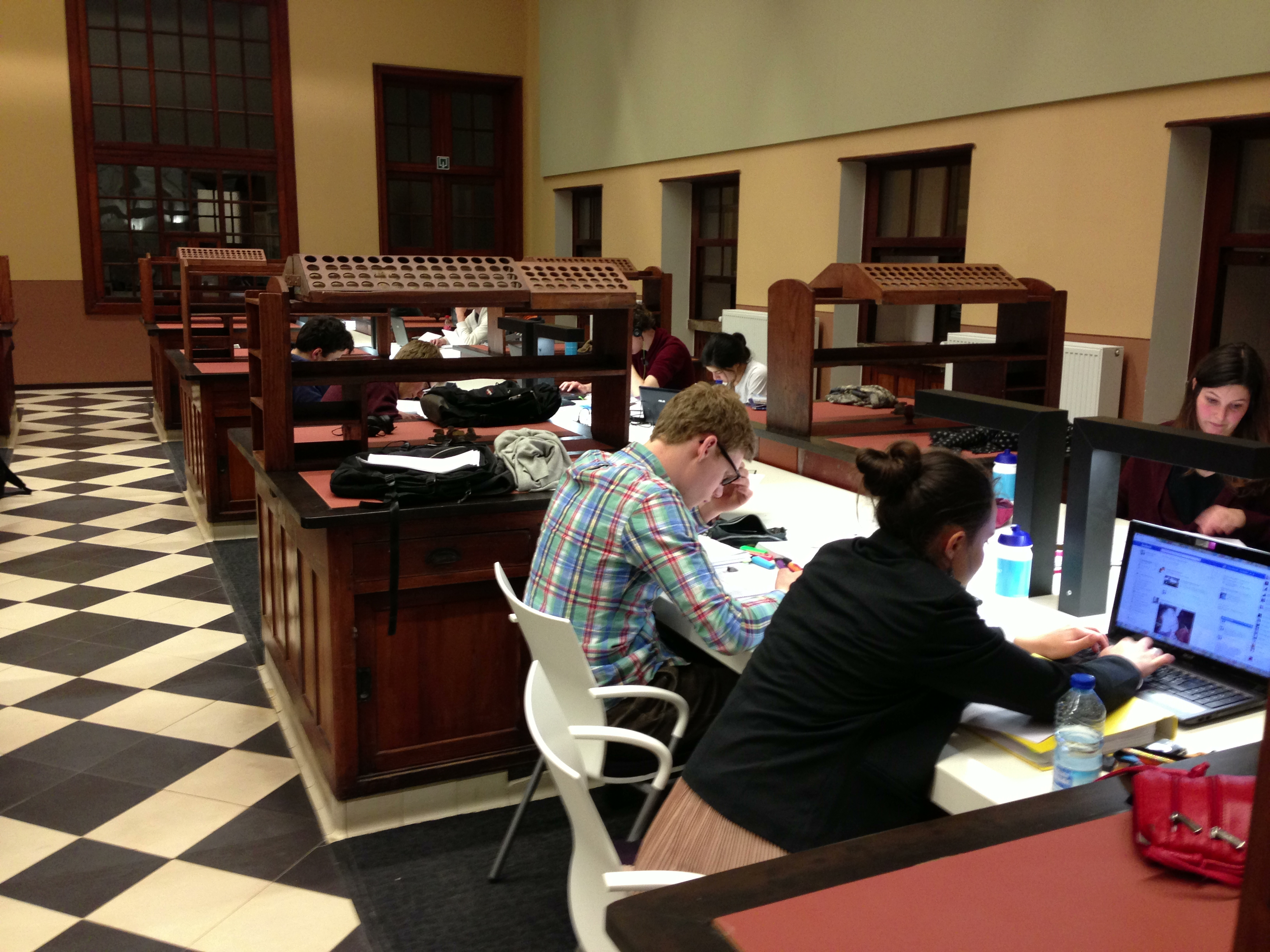
Students study in learning center AGORA at KU Leuven.

KU Leuven's main campus is in Leuven where school faculties, libraries, institutes, residence halls, the university hospital UZ Leuven, and other facilities are interspersed throughout the city proper, as well as just outside its ring road in Heverlee borough. Its intercultural meeting center Pangaea is located in the city center. The University Sports Centre is located in Heverlee, including Univ-Fit gym. In addition, the UNESCO World Heritage Site Groot Begijnhof, a historic beguinage in the south of city, is owned by the university and functions as one of its many residence halls.

Public transport within the city is primarily served by the De Lijn bus system. Leuven is a main hub in Belgium's and nearby country's train network. Leuven station is located in the northeast edge of the city.

KU Leuven has campuses in Kortrijk, Antwerp, Ghent, Bruges, Ostend, Geel, Diepenbeek, Aalst, Sint-Katelijne-Waver, Brussels.

== Organization and academics ==
Academics at KU Leuven is organized into three groups, each with its own faculties, departments, and schools offering programs up to doctoral level. While most courses are taught in Dutch, many are offered in English, particularly the graduate programs. Notable divisions of the university include the Institute of Philosophy and the Rega Institute for Medical Research.

The students of the university are gathered together in the student council Studentenraad KU Leuven.

== Libraries ==
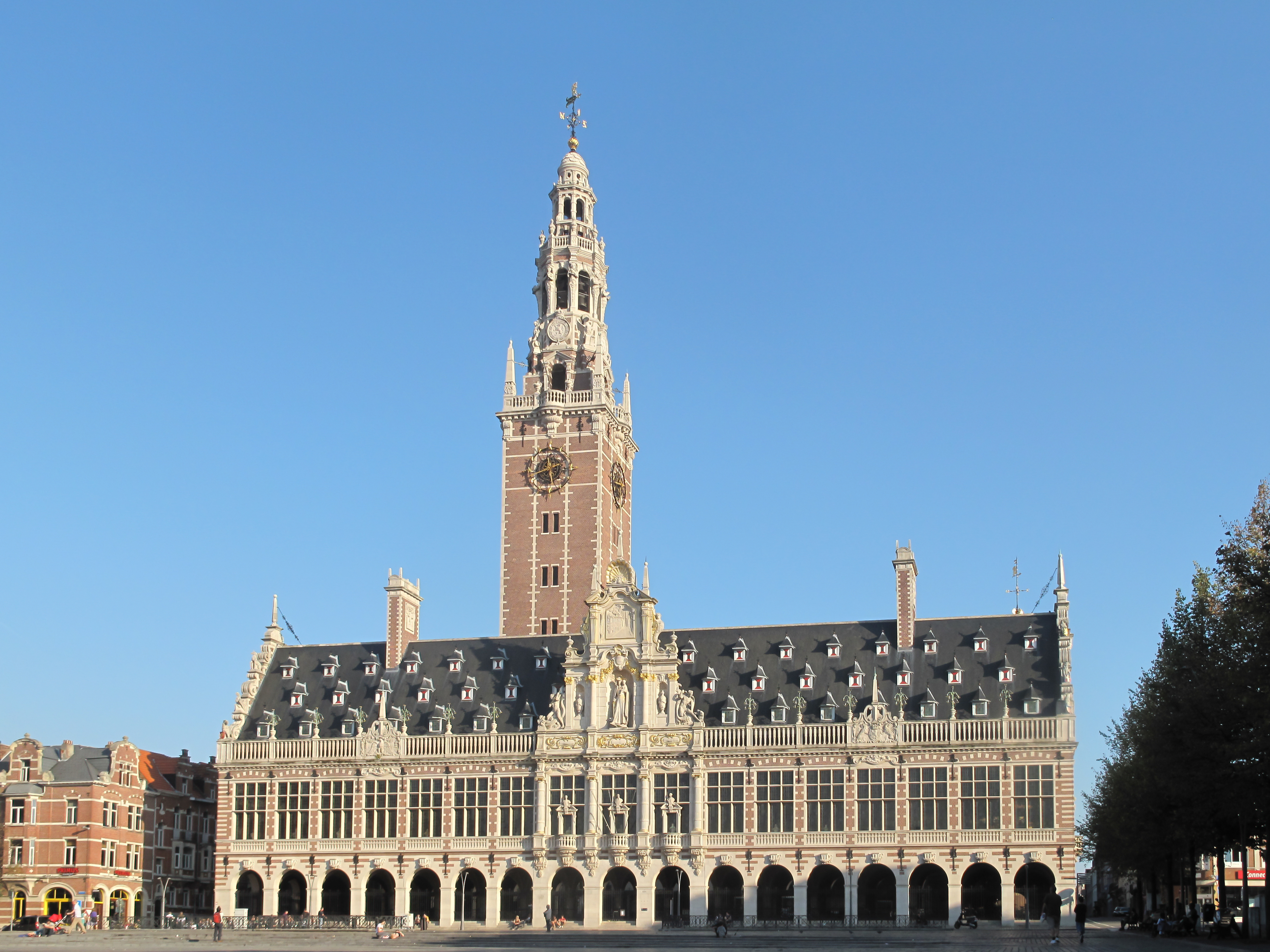
Central Library of the KU Leuven, seen from the Mgr. Ladeuzeplein

KU Leuven has 24 libraries and learning centers across its 12 campuses, containing millions of books and other media. Its theology library alone hold 1.3 million volumes, including works dating from the 15th century. The following libraries are found at its Leuven campus:

- 2Bergen — Biomedical Library
- 2Bergen — Campuslibrary Arenberg (exact sciences, engineering sciences, industrial engineering sciences, bio-engineering sciences, architecture and kinesiology and rehabilitation sciences)
- Artes — Ladeuze & Erasmushuis (Humanities & Social Sciences Group and the Faculty of Arts)
- Library of Psychology and Educational Sciences
- Law Library
- Library of Social Sciences
- Library of the Institute of Philosophy
- AGORA Learning Centre
- EBIB Learning Centre
- MATRIX (music and audio recordings library)
- Maurits Sabbe Library (Library of the Faculty of Theology and Religious Studies)

== University hospital ==
Universitair ziekenhuis Leuven (UZ Leuven) is the teaching hospital associated with the KU Leuven. Its most well known and largest campus is Gasthuisberg, which also houses the faculty of pharmaceutical sciences and most of the faculty of medicine.

== Breakthrough and notable research ==
KU Leuven scientists have managed to produce a solar hydrogen panel, which is able to directly convert no less than 15 per cent of sunlight into hydrogen gas, which according to them is a world record. In the solar hydrogen panel the hydrogen and oxygen evolution reactions are performed in the gas phase in cathode and anode compartments separated by a membrane. Anion exchange membranes provide an alkaline environment enabling the use of earth abundant materials as electrocatalysts.

According to IEEE Spectrum in 2019 this is a giant leap from 0.1% efficiency 10 years earlier.

This technology bypasses the conversion losses of the classical solar–hydrogen energy cycle where solar power is first harvested via a solar panel and only then to converted to hydrogen with electrolysis plants.

== Affiliations ==
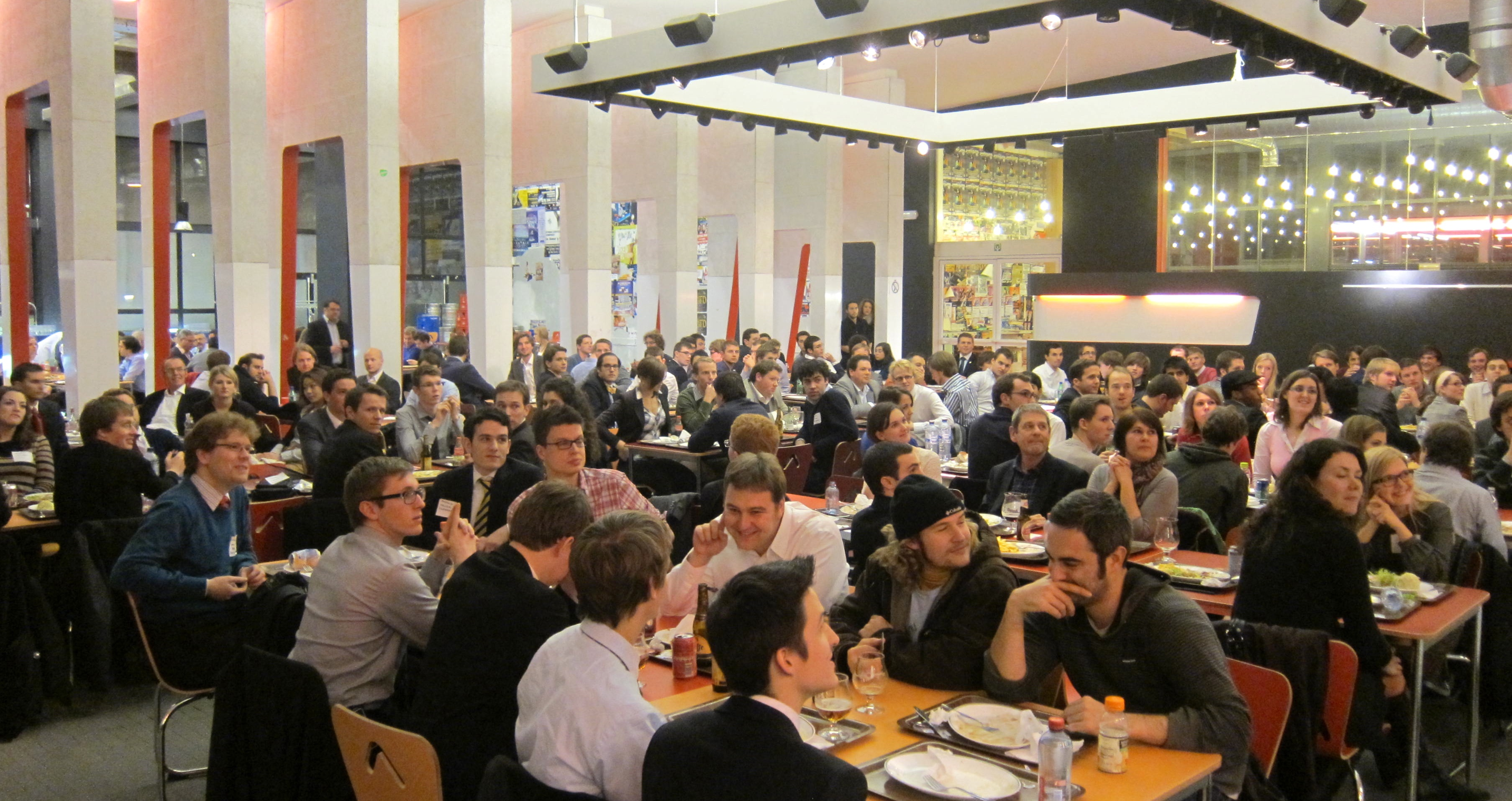
Students attending a conference at KU Leuven

Since July 2002, thirteen higher education institutes have formed the KU Leuven Association. Members include:

- KU Leuven
- LUCA School of Arts
- Odisee
- Thomas More
- UC Leuven Limburg
- Vives

KU Leuven is a member of a number of international university affiliations including the League of European Research Universities, Coimbra Group, Una Europa, Universitas 21, and Venice International University, among others.

The university is a member of the Flanders Interuniversity Institute of Biotechnology. The Interuniversity Microelectronics Centre is a spin-off company of the university.

== Journal ==
KU Leuven publishes Jura Falconis, a student-edited law review of the Faculty of Law. It was founded by a group of students from the Law Faculty of the Katholieke Universiteit Leuven who, in 1964, conceived the idea of producing their own law journal grafted on the famous American law reviews.

Every year, Jura Falconis organizes the Jura Falconis Prijs, an award for the best legal dissertation. Students at Flemish faculties of law submit their dissertations, which are judged by a panel of professors of law, including a judge of the Belgian Court of Cassation.

== Rankings ==
University rankings

Global – Overall
- ARWU World: 76 (2025)
- CWUR World: 98 (2026)
- CWTS World: 67 (2025)
- QS World: 59 (2027)
- Reuters World: 7 (2019)
- THE World: 43 (2026)
- USNWR Global: 46 (2026-27)

National – Overall
- ARWU National: 1 (2025)
- CWTS National: 1 (2025)
- CWUR National: 1 (2026)
- QS National: 1 (2027)
- THE National: 1 (2025\6)
- USNWR National: 1 (2026-27)

As of 2024, KU Leuven ranks high in the major international rankings, i.e. 63rd in the QS World University Rankings, 43rd in the Times Higher Education rankings, and 78th according to the Shanghai Academic Ranking of World Universities. And as stated by other prominent global rankings in 2024, the university is ranked 48th in the U.S. News & World Report Best Global Universities Ranking, 61st in the CWTS Leiden Ranking and 103rd in the Center for World University Rankings. Furthermore, in their 2019 rankings of the World's Most Innovative Universities, Thomson Reuters placed KU Leuven 7th in the world and best university in Europe (1st), four times in a row since its founding in 2016.

According to QS World University Rankings by Subject in 2019, KU Leuven ranked within the world's top 50 universities in the following fields: Sports-related Subjects (11), Theology (14), Dentistry (17), Classics and Ancient History (22), Library and Information Management (23), Psychology (24), Statistics and Operational Research (26), Mechanical Engineering (30), Philosophy (31), Geography (34), Pharmacy & Pharmacology (35), Education and Training (36), Law (37), Social Policy and Administration (39), Development Studies (43), Materials sciences (45), Chemical Engineering (46), Politics (49), Sociology (50), Life Sciences and Medicine (56), Social Sciences and Management (60), Arts and Humanities (61), Engineering and Technology (61). Also according to QS, many other KU Leuven programs rank within the top 100 in the world, including Linguistics, English Language and Literature, History, Anatomy and Physiology, Architecture, Anthropology, Computer Science and Information System, Biological Sciences, Civil and Structural Engineering, Electrical and Electronic Engineering, Business and Management Studies, Mathematics, Economics and Econometrics, Chemistry, Accounting and Finance .

Year	World university ranking	European university ranking	World reputation ranking
2011	86 (QS ▼21) | 119 (THE)	35 (QS ▼14) | 37 (THE)	
2012	68 (QS ▲18) | 67 (THE ▲52)	24 (QS ▲11) | 17 (THE ▲20)	81-90 (THE)
2013	82 (QS ▼14) | 58 (THE ▲9)	31 (QS ▼7) | 13 (THE ▲4)	81-90 (THE)
2014	77 (QS ▲5) | 61 (THE ▼3)	29 (QS ▲2) | 17 (THE ▼4)	71-80 (THE ▲)
2015	82 (QS ▼5) | 55 (THE ▲6) | 96 (ARWU ▲)	31 (QS ▼2) | 13 (THE ▲4) | 32 (ARWU ▲)	71-80 (THE)
2016	82 (QS) | 35 (THE ▲20) | 90 (ARWU ▲6)	31 (QS) | 12 (THE ▲1) | 32 (ARWU)	51-60 (THE ▲)
2017	79 (QS ▲3) | 40 (THE ▼5) | 93 (ARWU ▼3)	26 (QS ▲5) | 12 (THE) | 32 (ARWU)	51-60 (THE)
2018	71(QS ▲8) | 47 (THE ▼7) | 90 (ARWU ▲3)	21 (QS ▲5) | 14 (THE ▼2) | 31 (ARWU ▲1)	71-80 (THE ▼)
2019	48 (THE ▼1) | 86 (ARWU ▲4)	15 (THE ▼ ) | 28 (ARWU ▲3)	51-60 (THE ▲)

== Rectors ==
On 20 May 2025, Severine Vermeire was elected as the first female rector of KU Leuven in the university's history, winning with 51.9% of the votes in the university's electoral college. Her election marked a historic milestone for the institution, which was previously only been led by male rectors.

#	Name	Began office	Ended office	Studies	Vice-rector
1	Pieter De Somer	1968	1985	Medicine	
2	Roger Dillemans	1985	1995	Law	
3	André Oosterlinck	1995	2005	Engineering	
4	Marc Vervenne	2005	2009	Theology	Mark Waer
5	Mark Waer	2009	2013	Medicine	
6	Rik Torfs	2013	2017	Canon Law	
7	Luc Sels	2017	August 1st, 2025	Economics	
8	Severine Vermeire	August 1st, 2025	2029	Medicine	

== Notable alumni ==
- Leon Bekaert (b. 1958), economics, businessman
- Paul Bulcke (b. 1954), economics, businessman, CEO of Nestlé
- Jan Callewaert, economics, founder of Option N.V.
- Peter Carmeliet, physician and medical scientist
- Gerbrand Ceder, Daniel M. Tellep Distinguished Professor of Materials Science and Engineering at University of California, Berkeley
- Mathew Chandrankunnel (b. 1958), professor of philosophy of science at Dharmaram Vidya Kshetram
- Mathias Cormann (b. 1970), Belgian-born Australian senator and Minister for Finance
- Jo Cornu, engineer, previous CEO of the National Railway Company of Belgium
- Joan Daemen (b. 1965), cryptographer, one of the designers of Advanced Encryption Standard (AES).
- Frans C. De Schryver (b. 1939), chemist
- Julien, Baron De Wilde (b. 1967), civil engineer, businessman
- Noël, Baron Devisch (b. 1943), agriculture
- Shelton Fabre (b. 1963), American Roman Catholic bishop
- Gabriel Fehervari (b. 1970), law, businessman
- Koen Geens, law, jurist and politician, former Minister of Justice
- Willy Geysen, law, head of the Centre for Intellectual Property Rights (CIR)
- Francis Halzen (b. 1944), Belgian-American particle physicist, winner of the Nobel Physics Prize 2026
- Thomas Hertog (b. 1975) physics, cosmologist
- Jozef IJsewijn, prominent as a key founder of Neo-Latin studies
- Suriya Evans-Pritchard Jayanti, American diplomat, U.S. Department of State
- Abdul Qadeer Khan (b. 1936), founder of Pakistan's Nuclear Program
- Koen Lamberts (b. 1964), President and Vice-Chancellor, University of Sheffield (United Kingdom)
- Maarten Larmuseau (b. 1983), Belgian genetic genealogist
- Koenraad, Baron Lenaerts, law, president of the European Court of Justice
- Georges Meekers (b. 1965), Belgian-born wine writer and educator
- Simon Mignolet (b. 1988), goalkeeper
- Gerald Misinzo, molecular biology, Tanzanian veterinary virologist and professor
- Martin Moors, philosopher
- Rudi Pauwels (b. 1960), pharmacologist, co-founder of Tibotec and Virco
- Vincent Rijmen (b. 1970), cryptographer, one of the designers of Advanced Encryption Standard (AES).
- Willy Sansen (b. 1943), electrical engineer, academic, and author.
- Guðmundur Steingrímsson (b. 1972), Icelandic politician
- Willy Stevens (b. 1939), Belgian economist and diplomat
- Francine Swiggers, economics, businesswoman
- Wu Rong-i, economics, former Vice Premier of Taiwan, Taiwanese politician
- Andreas Utermann, finance, former CEO of Allianz Global Investors
- Jef Valkeniers, doctor and politician
- Astrid van Oyen, archaeologist and professor
- Marc Van Ranst (b. 1965), physician, virologist
- Herman, Count Van Rompuy (b. 1947), Belgian statesman, appointed President of the European Council in November 2009
- Frans Vanistendael, law
- Catherine Verfaillie (b. 1957) physician, stem cell scientist
- Koen Vervaeke (b. 1959), history, diplomat
- Isaac Wardell (b. 1979), musician, composer
- Joseph Pamplany (b. 1969), Archbishop of the Syro-Malabar Church, writer

== Honorary doctorates ==
Notable recipients of honorary doctorates at the KU Leuven include:

- Albert II of Belgium (1961), King of the Belgians
- James P. Allison (2017), Immunologist, Nobel Prize in Physiology or Medicine 2018
- Timothy Garton Ash (2011), British historian and Professor of European Studies, University of Oxford
- Michelle Bachelet (2015), President of Chile
- Abhijit Banerjee (2014), Indian economist, Massachusetts Institute of Technology
- Patriarch Bartholomew I of Constantinople (1996)
- Baudouin of Belgium (1951), King of the Belgians
- Roberto Benigni (2007), Italian actor, comedian, screenwriter and director of film, theatre and television.
- John Braithwaite (2008), Australian criminologist (application of the idea of restorative justice to business regulation and peacebuilding)
- Manuel Castells (2004), Professor of Sociology, Open University of Catalonia, University of Southern California
- Leon O. Chua (2013), professor in the electrical engineering and computer sciences department at the University of California, Berkeley
- Carla Del Ponte (2002), former Chief prosecutor of two United Nations international criminal law tribunals
- Jared Diamond (2008), professor of Geography and Physiology, UCLA
- Jacques Derrida (1989), French philosopher
- John Kenneth Galbraith (1972), Canadian economist
- Nadine Gordimer (1980), South African author, Booker Prize 1974, Nobel Prize in Literature 1991
- Alan Greenspan (1997), economist, former chairman of the Board of Governors of the US Federal Reserve
- Eugène Ionesco (1977), Romanian and French playwright
- Ban Ki-moon (2015), Secretary-General of the United Nations
- Helmut Kohl (1996), former Chancellor of Germany
- Christine Lagarde (2012), Managing Director of the International Monetary Fund (IMF)
- Mario Vargas Llosa (2003), Peruvian writer
- Angela Merkel (2017), German politician, Chancellor of Germany
- Sir Michael Marmot (2014), British epidemiologist, University College London
- Martha Nussbaum (1997), American philosopher, University of Chicago
- Dirk Obbink, Lecturer in Papyrology and Greek Literature at Oxford University and the head of the Oxyrhynchus Papyri Project.
- Sir Roger Penrose (2005), professor in Mathematical Physics, University of Oxford
- Navi Pillay (2012), United Nations High Commissioner for Human Rights
- Thomas S. Popkewitz (2004), professor of curriculum theory, University of Wisconsin-Madison School of Education
- Mary Robinson (2000), former President of Ireland
- Jacques, Count Rogge (2012), President of the International Olympic Committee (IOC)
- Oscar Arnulfo Romero (1980), archbishop of San Salvador (El Salvador), human rights activist
- Helmut Schmidt (1983), former Chancellor of Germany
- Nate Silver (2013), American author and statistician
- Fiona Stanley (2014), Australian epidemiologist
- Rowan Williams (2011), Archbishop of Canterbury

== See also ==
- Academic libraries in Leuven
- Arenberg Research-Park
- Haasrode Research-Park
- Interdisciplinary Centre for Law and ICT
- Science and technology in Flanders
- University Foundation
- List of oldest universities in continuous operation
- List of split up universities
- List of universities in Belgium

== Bibliography ==
- 1860: Souvenir du XXVe anniversaire de la fondation de l'Université catholique: Novembre 1859, Louvain, typographie Vanlinthout et Cie, 1860 Souvenir du XXVe anniversaire de la fondation de l'Université catholique: Novembre 1859.
