= Pieter De Somer =

Belgian physician and biologist

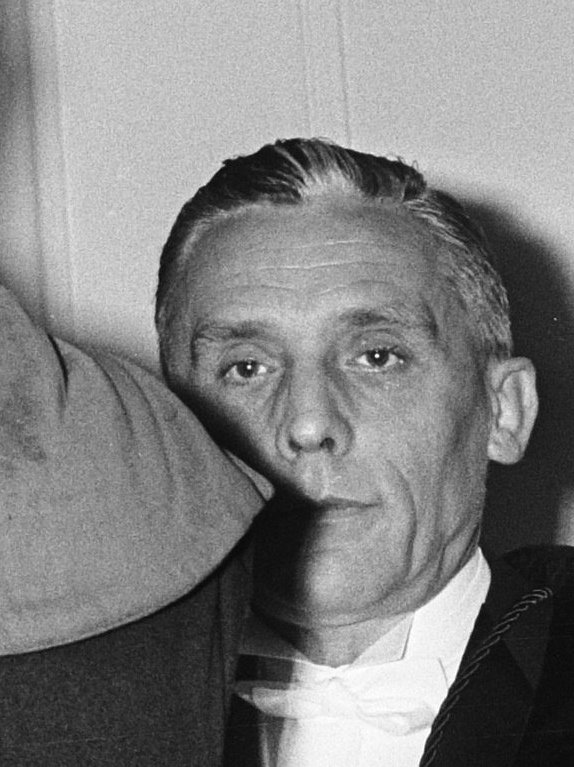
- De Somer in 1967
- Born: December 22, 1917
- Died: June 17, 1985
- Occupations: Physician and biologist

Pieter De Somer (22 December 1917 – 17 June 1985) was a Belgian physician and biologist. He studied medicine from 1935 up to 1942 at the Catholic University of Leuven (Leuven, Belgium). He did research and later became a professor at the Department of medicine, where he specialised in microbiology and immunology. In 1968, he became the first rector of the Flemish Katholieke Universiteit Leuven and he remained rector until his death in 1985.

Pieter De Somer founded both the company Recherche et Industrie Thérapeutiques and the Rega Institute for Medical Research.

On 26 september 1989, an auditorium was built and named after Pieter (Aula Pieter De Somer, in Dutch). Also a statue of him can be found at the entrance of the building.
