= EASN Association =

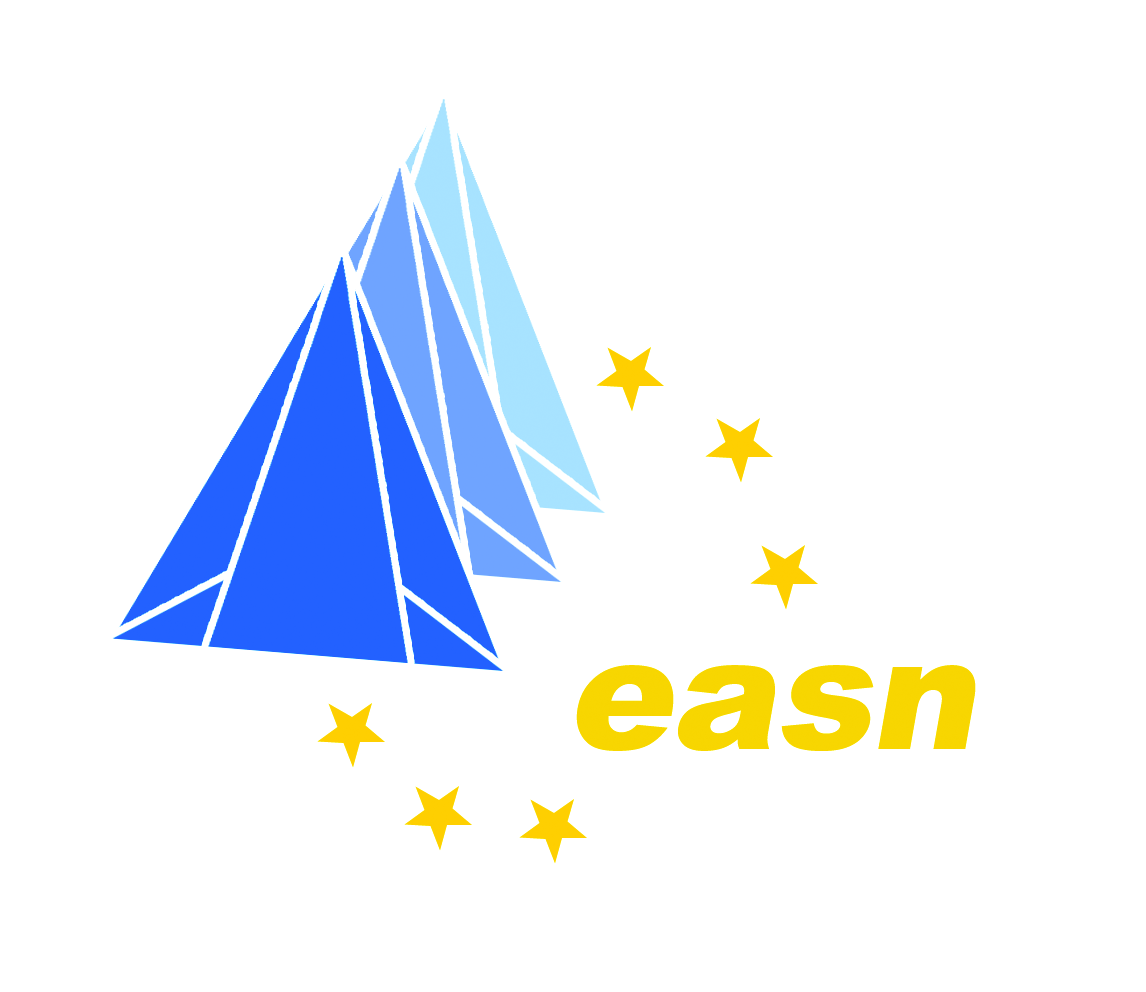

The European Aeronautics Science Network (EASN) is an international non-profit association dedicated to the advancement of the European aeronautics sciences and technologies. The establishment of EASN goes back to 2002 and it was based on two subsequent support actions funded by the European Commission while it was founded as an open, self-funded and self sustainable association in 2008. Specifically, the EASN Association is the Association of the European Academia active in supporting aviation research, facing the fragmentation of Academia and disseminating the new knowledge and breakthrough technologies incubated through aviation research. Headquartered in Brussels, Belgium, the EASN Association encounters members across 28 European countries with the number constantly increasing.

== Overview ==
On 6 May 2008 the EASN Association was officially established by 22 distinguished personalities of the European Aeronautics research community, with the encouragement of the European Commission and the support of several university professors throughout Europe. The mission of the Association is to contribute to the advancement of the aeronautics sciences and technologies and support the education and research in Europe. The tools for accomplishing the above objectives include among others the organization of scientific events, research forums and collaboration with other networks and associations. In 2017, the Association counted approximately 350 effective members Europe-wide. These effective members are individuals mainly from European universities active in aviation research. Furthermore, the Association has a number of about 50 associate members which are highly ranked entities, such as Universities, University Departments, Research Establishments, SMEs, Industries and Laboratories. Among the Association's associate members top universities are included such as KU Leuven, Polytechnic University of Milan, Warsaw University of Technology, University of Stuttgart, Politecnico di Torino, RWTH Aachen University etc., Research Establishments such as the German Aerospace Center (DLR), Italian Aerospace Research Centre (CIRA), Office National d'Etudes et de Recherches Aérospatiales (ONERA) etc. and European manufacturers such as Airbus. Furthermore, the Association is connected with 15.000 researchers across 28 European countries while has strong links with other networks.
