= Interdisciplinary Centre for Law and ICT =

The Interdisciplinary Centre for Law and ICT (ICRI) is an interdisciplinary centre based at the Katholieke Universiteit Leuven, Leuven. ICRI focuses its research on the interplay of Law and ICT and has been involved in numerous national and European projects relating to IT Law.
