= Frans C. De Schryver =

Belgian physical chemist (born 1939)

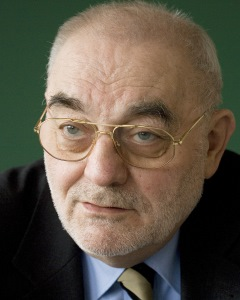
Frans C. De Schryver

Frans Carl De Schryver (born September 21, 1939) is a Belgian chemist currently serving as Professor Emeritus in the Department of Chemistry of the KU Leuven. Pursuing his interests in polymer synthesis, time and space resolved chemistry, he founded the Laboratory for Photochemistry and Spectroscopy at the KU Leuven. He has co-authored over 650 papers in peer-reviewed journals.

== Early life and education ==
Frans Carl De Schryver was born in Sint-Niklaas on September 21, 1939. He carried out his undergraduate studies in Physical Chemistry at KU Leuven. After the obligatory military service, he pursued his career in science with a PhD in polymer chemistry in the laboratory of Prof Dr. Georges Smets. During the same period, he married his wife Suzy, in 1962, and became father of two daughters, Dominique and Catherine.

He completed his PhD in 1964, and with the encouragement of his supervisor, Prof. Smets, followed it with a Post-Doctoral stay (with a Fulbright Fellowship) at the University of Arizona, Tucson in the group of Prof. Cars Shipp Marvel. Although the initial focus of his Post-Doctoral stay was polymer synthesis, he became more and more interested in photochemistry. This new interest was partially driven by the possibilities it could offer to the photographic industry in Antwerp and the prospects for a potential industrial career upon returning to Belgium. After his stay in Arizona, Frans had short research stays in the groups of Prof. Theodor Föster in 1970 (Stuttgart University, Germany), and Prof. Albert Weller in 1971 (Max Planck institute for Biophysical Chemistry, Germany) with his focus on photochemistry and photophysics, back then an emerging domain.

== Career and work ==
In 1969, Frans obtained a position as an assistant docent at KU Leuven. 4 years later, in 1973, he became an associated professor at the institute. He started building his own research group, which would later evolve into the Laboratory for Photochemistry and Spectroscopy (LPS). In parallel with his research, Frans was also dedicated to education. During his teaching activities the curricula at the KU Leuven changed and new courses including the topics of spectroscopy and photochemistry were introduced by Frans. In 1974, he co-organized a conference (Conference on Photochemistry in polymers) for the first time and in July 1978 Frans co-organized the international conference “7th IUPAC Symposium on Photochemistry" in Heverlee, Belgium chaired by Prof. Nicholas Turro. From then he was a driving force involved in a total of 30 conferences and symposia, both national and international. In 1975 Frans De Schrijver became a full professor at KU Leuven.

Prof. De Schryver has been a very active researcher, as demonstrated by the many visiting professor positions he has been offered throughout his career. Some of these include renowned institutions such as the Université Paris-Sud, Orsay, France (1980); the Japanese Society for the Promotion of Science, Japan (1983); British Council (1984); Academia Sinica, China (1985) and the Ecole Nationale Supérieure de Cachan (1992). From 1980 to 2004 he was an extra ordinarius professor at the Université Catholique de Louvain. In addition to his scientific research, he always kept a close relationship with industry, resulting in several patents. Frans was a summer visiting scientist at IBM (1988), and his laboratory had long-term collaborations in place with other companies that worked on photopolymerization, xerography and novel printing systems (such as Agfa-Gevaert, and Imperial Chemical Industries, later Akzo Nobel.

Throughout his career Frans was an active member of many evaluation committees and granting institutions, both national and international. He held a seat on several editorial boards of international peer reviewed journals, such as Angewandte Chemie and was an editor of ChemPhysChem and Photochemistry & Photobiological Sciences (PPS). Serving the science community, he was an evaluator of granting schemes of ERC, NWO, FWO, DFG, AERES, ANR, ESF and the Swedish Research Council. In Belgium, Frans became an official member of the 'Klasse van de Natuurwetenschappen' of the Royal Flemish Academy of Belgium for Science and Arts in October 1989. In 2002 he became President of the 'Klasse van de Natuurwetenschappen' and is currently still an emeritus member. At the start of the academic year 2004-2005 Frans officially became Professor Emeritus at the department of Chemistry, faculty of science at KU Leuven.

In 2019 he was an Emeritus Guest on the 25th International Anniversary Workshop on "Single Molecule Spectroscopy and Super-resolution Microscopy in the Life Sciences" in Berlin. In that same year, Frans turned 80, which was an occasion celebrated by a unique symposium in Leuven, bringing together many national and international friends and colleagues from throughout his whole career. This symposium was organized by a small team of the division of molecular imaging and photonics, KU Leuven. Among this team were two of his former PhD students (Prof. Johan Hofkens & Prof. Steven De Feyter), now both heading their own groups in the department of Chemistry at KU Leuven.

== Scientific work ==
As a polymer scientist Frans De Schryver finished his master-thesis in 1961 with the title "Reaction of Phenyl Isocyanate with Aryl Amines". Four years later he delivered his PhD-thesis on the "Influence of the Viscosity on the Photopolymerization of Styrene". The beginning years of his career were mainly focused on the study of excited states of organic synthetic systems. Slowly his research focus was shifting more towards photoinitiated polymerization. Upon his return to KU Leuven he founded his research group, that would evolve to become the "Laboratory of Photochemistry and Spectroscopy". At the end of eighties through a summer stay at the IBM Laboratory at Almaden, contacts with the group of Prof. Urs Wild (ETH) and participation in the research board of Prof. Masuhara's Erato project "Micro-photoconversion" it became clear to Frans and his coworkers that spatial resolution was the next important step forward. From then the lab started to invest in optical microscopy. After his promotion to full professor at KU Leuven his scope shifted more towards photophysics of organic systems including time resolved spectroscopy. From the mid-nineties the lab also started to study time and space resolved spectroscopy and scanning probe microscopy, to unravel the fundamentals of super and supramolecular systems.

In 1993 Frans was awarded a Humboldt fellowship, which he carried out at MPI Mainz with Prof. Gerhard Wegner. One of his colleagues was Dr. Jürgen Rabe (later professor), who had just returned from Almaden where he had made the first Scanning Tunneling Microscopy images of organic molecules on graphite. On his return to Belgium Frans set up a research program "Scaling down in time and space" going from picosecond time resolution to femtosecond spectroscopy, installing scanning probe microscopy and optical microscopy. Together with young colleagues the research group contributed extensively to advances in the field of scanning probe and single molecule microscopy. All the work of Frans' laboratory and his collaborations resulted in a major contribution towards the scientific community and is internationally recognized. This is proven by the ISI report where more than 650 publications are reported in peer reviewed journals, a reported h-index of 94 in Google Scholar and a ResearchGate score of 50.88, among others.

The research done by Frans' group was always characterized by both fundamental knowledge and the drive to unravel new mechanisms as well as important international collaborations with synthetically and photo-physically oriented groups. In order to set up both scientific networks and symposia to disseminate knowledge, networking became an important part of his scientific career. His professional Curriculum Vitae, from 1986 - 2004, contains almost 160 attended conferences where he was selected as invited speaker. In institutions across the globe he visited more than 80 institutions, amongst them prestigious institutions in Germany (MPI for Polymer Research), United States (University of Arizona) and Japan (Osaka University). All the time and effort spent in research, teaching and travelling was recognized by the scientific community. Since the start of his career Professor De Schryver has been acknowledged with more than 50 professional nominations and 22 academic nominations. Apart from these, Frans has been honored with a few very prestigious awards.

== Honours and awards ==
- 1964: Fulbright Research Fellowship (USA)
- 1971: Laureaat Koninklijke Vlaamse Academie van België voor Wetenschappen & Kunsten (1971)
- 1993: Senior Research Awardee of the Alexander von Humboldt Foundation (Germany)
- 1995: American Association for the Advancement of Science (AAAS) fellow
- 1997: Chaire Bruylants award (Belgium)
- 1998: Porter Medalist, awarded jointly by the European, Inter-American, and Japanese Photochemical Societies
- 1998: Francqui Chair (Belgium)
- 1999: Havinga Medal (The Netherlands)
- 1999: Förster Memorial Lecturer (German Chemical Society)
- 2000: Frontiers in Biochemistry Award (MPI Mulheim)
- 2001: Max Planck Forschungs Prize (Germany)
- 2002: International Award of the Japanese Photochemical Society (Japan)
- 2005: Special medal of The University of Groningen (The Netherlands)
- 2005: ChemPhysChem published a special issue to honour Prof. De Schryver. "Frans De Schryver: Forty Years of Photochemistry and Photophysics"
- 2007: Blaise Pascal medal (European Academy of Sciences), Fellow of The Royal Society of Chemistry
- 2019: On the occasion of his 80th anniversary, the Molecular Imaging and Photonics division at the KU Leuven organized a one-day symposium to honor his scientific career, bringing together scientists from different generations who played an important role in his career. The list of speakers included Ben Feringa, Tanja Weil, Roeland Nolte, Klaus Müllen, Jürgen Rabe, Hiroshi Masuhara, Thomas Ebbesen, Loredana Latterini, Paolo Samori, Markus Sauer and Hua Zhang.
