= Willy Stevens =

Belgian diplomat

Willy J. Stevens (born 1939) is a Belgian economist and diplomat. He was ambassador of Belgium to Colombia, Central America, Mexico and Belize.

== Biography ==
Stevens studied commercial engineering at the Katholieke Universiteit Leuven, political sciences at the UCL (Université catholique de Louvain) and international relations and geopolitics at the Fletcher School of Law and Diplomacy (USA). He is a Doctor in Applied Economics (KUL) and received a Doctorate Honoris Causa in Economics at the Universidad del Rosario (Colombia).

After having collaborated as Industrial Development Officer at UNIDO (Vienna) he joined the Belgian Diplomatic Corps and was successively assigned to the Belgian embassies in Algeria and Paris, to the Belgian Permanent Representation to the UN in New York and to the cabinet of the Belgian Minister of Foreign Affairs Leo Tindemans. Later Stevens served as Belgian ambassador to Colombia, Consul General in Milan (Italy), regional ambassador to Central America, director of the American Hemisphere at the Belgian Ministry of Foreign Affairs and his country's Representative to the EU Committee for Latin America (COLAT) of which he became president. He ended his diplomatic career as Belgian ambassador to Mexico and Belize.

His publications include books on development problems (Capital Absorptive Capacity) and Latin America (Uitdagingen voor Latijns-America and Desafios para America Latina). Well-known international reviews have published numerous articles by him reflecting his interests on Latin America, durable national reconciliation in former military dictatorships, the EU, geopolitics and the interaction between art and politics.

Stevens regularly has taken part in EU election observation missions in Latin America. In 2012 he visited 30 countries in Latin America and the Caribbean as special envoy to defend the candidature of Liège for the International Exhibition of 2017.

He is frequently invited by universities and diplomatic academies of Europe, Latin America, the United States and Canada to deliver conferences on Latin America, the EU and geopolitics. Stevens is currently honorary president of VIRA (Flemish-Dutch Association of International Relations), president of the Academic Board and professor at CERIS in Brussels (Centre Européen de Recherches Internationales et Stratégiques), president of the Documentation Centre of the Flemish Art Heritage, chief executive of Artemis Art Gallery in Brussels and co-founder and member of the Board of the Foundation Andres Bello in Brussels.
