= Sels =

Sels is a Belgian surname that may refer to

- Constant Maurits Ernst van Löben Sels (1846–1923), Dutch army officer and politician
- Edward Sels (born 1941), Belgian racing cyclist
- Jack Sels (1922–1970), Belgian jazz saxophonist, arranger and composer
- Jelle Sels (born 1995), Dutch tennis player
- Luc Sels (born 1967), Belgian sociologist
- Matz Sels (born 1992), Belgian football player
- Maurits van Löben Sels (1876–1944), Dutch fencer
- Rosa Sels (born 1943), Belgian racing cyclist, sister of Edward

== See also ==
- Schaal Sels-Merksem, one-day road bicycle race held in September in Belgium in honor of Jacques-Charles Sels
