= Willy Sansen =

Electrical engineer, academic, and author

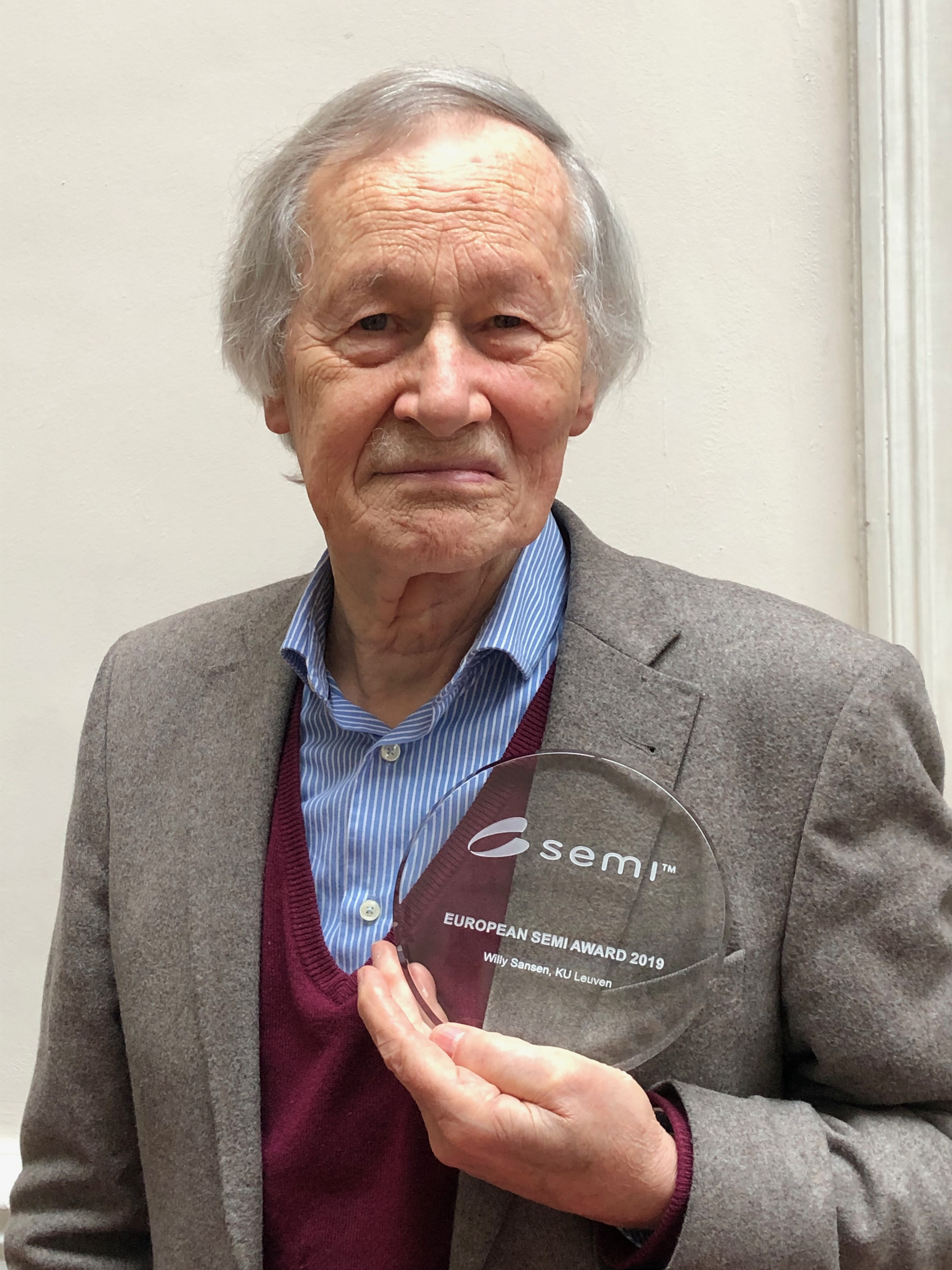
- Willy Sansen in 2021
- Born: May 16, 1943; Poperinge
- Died: April 25, 2024 (aged 80); Leuven, Belgium
- Occupations: Electrical engineer, academic and author
- Awards: IEEE Donald O. Pederson Award in Solid-State Circuits (2011)

Academic background
- Education: BSc; MSc., Electrical Engineering; PhD., Electronics
- Alma mater: Katholieke Universiteit Leuven; University of California, Berkeley

Academic work
- Institutions: Katholieke Universiteit Leuven

Willy Sansen (May 16, 1943 – April 25, 2024) was an electrical engineer, academic, and author. He is an emeritus professor of engineering science at the Katholieke Universiteit Leuven.

Sansen is known for his research in electronics, circuitry, and analog design. He has authored and co-authored more than 650 papers and 16 books including Analog Design Essentials, Symbolic Analysis for Automated Design of Analog Integrated Circuits, Low-Noise Wide-Band Amplifiers in Bipolar and CMOS Technologies, Biosensors: Microelectrochemical Devices, Design of Analog Integrated Circuits and Systems and Distortion analysis of analog integrated circuits. He received the 2011 IEEE Donald O. Pederson Award in Solid-State Circuits and is a Life Fellow of the IEEE.

== Education ==
Sansen obtained a master's degree in Electrical Engineering from the Katholieke Universiteit Leuven in 1967 and a Ph.D. in Electronics from the University of California, Berkeley in 1972.

== Career ==
Sansen began his academic career by returning to the Katholieke Universiteit Leuven in 1972. He became a full professor of engineering science at the Katholieke Universiteit Leuven in 1980, where he has been an emeritus professor since 2008.

Sansen was appointed to the ESAT laboratory of the K.U. Leuven by the National Fund of Scientific Research, Belgium (NFWO). From 1984 to 1990, he served as the Head of the Department of Electrical Engineering. In 1984, he founded the ESAT-MICAS laboratory on analog design leading research projects within the industry.

Sansen served on the board of directors for Sipex from 1996 to 2003 and later on for Tyndall in Cork, Ireland from 2016 to 2021. He has been on the board of directors for Caeleste, Mechelen, Belgium since 2017, and on the Scientific Board for SAL, Graz, Austria since 2018. He was the first European Program Chair of the ISSCC Conference in 2002 and the first European President of the Solid-State Circuits Society from 2008 to 2009. He has given courses in companies including Philips (NXP), Siemens (Infineon), National Semiconductor (now TI), Bosch, Cypress, MCCI, Cork, and IMEC in Leuven.

== Research ==
Sansen has contributed to the field of electrical engineering by studying design automation and analog integrated circuit designs for telecommunications, consumer electronics, medical applications, and sensors.

== Works ==
Sansen investigated circuitry, amplifiers, and electrical design systems in his works. In the book Analog Design Essentials, he focused on essential topics for analog designers, such as operational amplifier basics, and opamp synthesis, and also addressed noise, distortion, filters, ADC/DACs, and oscillators. In his review for Optics and Photonics News, Bogdan Hoanca remarked, "The book itself has 24 chapters and covers basic transistor concepts and amplifier design as well as more advanced topics such as filter design, oscillators, and analog and digital conversion. The color slides include circuit diagrams along with topic headings as well as some references. The book concludes with a comprehensive index... is particularly useful for the photonics researcher. The book is ideal for self-study."

Sansen contributed to the analog circuit design literature with his collaborative works Distortion Analysis of Analog Integrated Circuits with Piet Wambacq and Symbolic Analysis for Automated Design of Analog Integrated Circuits with Georges Gielen, where they introduced analog design automation through the lens of symbolic analysis. He also provided guides for senior engineers aiming to optimize high-precision analog circuits, covering design techniques in bipolar, CMOS, and BiCMOS technologies for applications like receiver front-ends and particle detectors, with books like Low-Noise Wide-Band Amplifiers in Bipolar and CMOS Technologies co-authored with Zhong Yuan Chong, and Design of Analog Integrated Circuits and Systems with Kenneth Laker.

Sansen also co-wrote Biosensors: Microelectrochemical Devices with M. Lambrechts which looks into microelectrochemical and analytical devices like biosensors. In a review published in Advanced Materials, Wolfgang Schuhmann wrote "...the book may help (bio)chemists to obtain the necessary knowledge of and terminology for sensor-orientated microelectronic fabrication technologies which is important in the interdisciplinary discussion between chemists, materials scientists and electronics engineers on the way to integrated biosensors."

=== Analog integrated circuit designs ===
Sansen has researched analog integrated circuit designs throughout his career. In a joint study, he provided an overview of symbolic analysis in electronic circuit design, explaining its application areas, capabilities, and limitations, focusing on generating analytic expressions for circuit characteristics using symbolic representations of circuit elements. In another collaborative work, he presented a 12-bit intrinsic accuracy digital-to-analog converter, integrated into a standard 0.5 μm CMOS technology, with no calibration or trimming required, achieving a resolution of 12 bits at a 300 MS/s update rate.

With Michiel Steyaert, Sansen demonstrated a CMOS low-power, low-noise monolithic instrumentation amplifier (IA) designed for medical applications, utilizing current feedback and single-stage operational transconductance amplifiers in the low-frequency loop, with variable gains controlled by software in the range of 14/20/26/40 dB for a bandwidth of 0.5–500 Hz. He further presented a 10-bit 1-GSample/s current-steering CMOS digital-to-analog converter with measured high accuracy, a custom-designed thermometer decoder, an optimized layout, and a spurious-free dynamic range of over 61 dB. Additionally, he collaborated to introduce a power-efficient comparator with enhanced speed and reduced die area, utilizing a differential input stage, two regenerative flip-flops, and an S-R latch, achieving 8-bit precision with a symmetrical input dynamic range of 2.5 V in an experimental integration.

=== Bioelectronics ===
Sansen has worked on nanotechnology and bioelectronics to understand biomolecular structures. In a collaborative study, he fabricated nanoscaled interdigitated electrode arrays using deep UV lithography, enabling impedimetric measurements for the detection of biomolecular structures with high sensitivity, demonstrated through the immobilization of glucose oxidase on Pd electrodes. He also showed that direct electric currents within the range of 10 microA to 1000 microA enhance ATP concentrations and stimulate amino acid incorporation into proteins in rat skin, with distinct mechanisms influencing ATP production and amino acid transport.

In a joint study, Sansen introduced a fully integrated microsensor chip for continuous monitoring of multiple blood gases, ions, and biomolecules, utilizing on-chip ISFETs, amperometric, and conductometric cells, allowing simultaneous monitoring of up to seven chemical substances, with on-chip interfacing and processing electronics, temperature control, and a one-time-use security check, fabricated in a standard 1.2-μm CMOS process.

== Awards and honors ==
- 1995 – Life Fellow, IEEE
- 2011 – Donald O. Pederson Award in Solid-State Circuits, IEEE
- 2019 – European SEMI Award

== Bibliography ==
=== Selected books ===
- Symbolic Analysis for Automated Design of Analog Integrated Circuits (1991) ISBN 978-0-7923-9161-6
- Low-Noise Wide-Band Amplifiers in Bipolar and CMOS Technologies (1991) ISBN 978-0-7923-9096-1
- Biosensors: Microelectrochemical Devices (1992) ISBN 978-0-7503-0112-1
- Design of Analog Integrated Circuits and Systems (1994) ISBN 978-0-07-036060-0
- Distortion analysis of analog integrated circuits (1998) ISBN 978-0-7923-8186-0
- Analog Design Essentials (2006) ISBN 978-0-387-25746-4

=== Selected articles ===
- Sansen, W. M., & Meyer, R. G. (1973). Distortion in bipolar transistor variable-gain amplifiers. IEEE Journal of Solid-State Circuits, 8(4), 275–282.
- Sansen, W. M. (1982). On the integration of an internal human conditioning system. IEEE Journal of Solid-State Circuits, 17(3), 513–521.
- S. Peeters, F. Officiers, M. Van Paemel, W. Sansen, and J. Marquet, "Background and feasibility of cochlear implant", SRBII, Proc. 1982.
- Degrauwe, M. G., & Sansen, W. M. (1984). The current efficiency of MOS transconductance amplifiers. IEEE journal of solid-state circuits, 19(3), 349–359.
- Steyaert, M. S., & Sansen, W. M. (1987). A micropower low-noise monolithic instrumentation amplifier for medical purposes. IEEE journal of solid-state circuits, 22(6), 1163–1168.
- Yin, G. M., Eynde, F. O., & Sansen, W. (1992). A high-speed CMOS comparator with 8-b resolution. IEEE Journal of Solid-State Circuits, 27(2), 208–211.
- Van Gerwen, P., Laureyn, W., Laureys, W., Huyberechts, G., De Beeck, M. O., Baert, K., ... & Mertens, R. (1998). Nanoscaled interdigitated electrode arrays for biochemical sensors. Sensors and Actuators B: Chemical, 49(1-2), 73–80.
- Bastos, J., Marques, A. M., Steyaert, M. S., & Sansen, W. (1998). A 12-bit intrinsic accuracy high-speed CMOS DAC. IEEE Journal of Solid-State Circuits, 33(12), 1959–1969.
- Van den Bosch, A., Borremans, M. A., Steyaert, M. S., & Sansen, W. (2001). A 10-bit 1-GSample/s Nyquist current-steering CMOS D/A converter. IEEE journal of solid-state circuits, 36(3), 315–324.
- Sansen, W. (2018). Biasing for zero distortion: Using the ekv\/bsim6 expressions. IEEE Solid-State Circuits Magazine, 10(3), 48–53.
- Chae, Y., Lopez, C. M., Makinwa, K. A., Ortmanns, M., & Sansen, W. (2023). A Glimpse of the History of Analog ICs: A Tale of Amplifiers, Data Converters, and Sensor Interfaces. IEEE Solid-State Circuits Magazine, 15(3), 43–52.
