= Rik Torfs =

Belgian canon law scholar and media personality

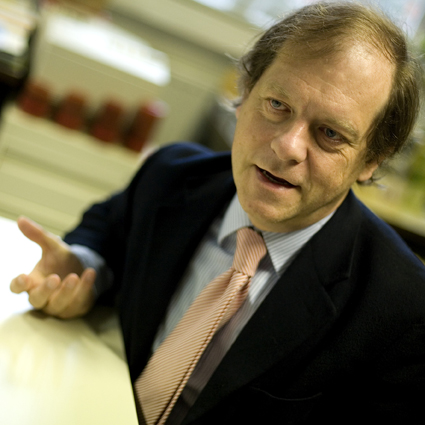
- Henri Maria Dymphna André Laurent "Rik" Torfs

Rector of KU Leuven
- In office 1 August 2013 – 31 July 2017
- Preceded by: Mark Waer
- Succeeded by: Luc Sels

Personal details
- Born: 16 October 1956 (age 69) Turnhout, Belgium
- Education: Katholieke Universiteit Leuven
- Profession: Professor of Canon Law

Henri Maria Dymphna André Laurent "Rik" Torfs (born 16 October 1956) is a Belgian canon law scholar and media personality. He is a former Senator for the Christian Democratic and Flemish party in the Belgian Federal Parliament and a former Rector of the Catholic University of Leuven.

== Education and academic career ==
He attended the Sint-Gummaruscollege (Lier) and studied law at the Katholieke Universiteit Leuven and the University of Strasbourg. He specialized in ecclesiastical or canon law. He received his JCD in 1987 with a dissertation on the canonical concept of marriage.

In 1988, Torfs became assistant professor in the Faculty of Canon Law at the Katholieke Universiteit Leuven. He became full-time professor in 1996. From 1994 to 2003 and 2009 to 2013, he served as Dean of the Faculty. He is a guest professor at the University of Stellenbosch, University of Paris, University of Nijmegen, and University of Strasbourg. Torfs also serves on the academic advisory board for the International Center for Law and Religion Studies at Brigham Young University and is a member of the board of experts at International Religious Liberty Association. He is a former president and board member of the European Consortium for Church and State Research and founder and board member of the Working Group Nederlandstalige Canonisten (Dutch-speaking Canonists). He became a member of the Commission for Intercultural dialogue in 2005, the Commissie ter invulling van de cursus maatschappelijke oriëntatie in 2006, and Les Assises de l’Interculturalité in 2009. He serves as an advisor to the government of Romania regarding the protection of religious minorities.

In 2005 Torfs ran for rector at KU Leuven, losing to Marc Vervenne. Vervenne could not serve a second term, and in 2008 Torfs announced he would not run for office in 2009. In 2013 he stepped down from politics and did participate in the election for Rector of KU Leuven. In On 17 May 2013, he was elected Rector after obtaining a majority of the votes in the second round. He assumed office on 1 August 2013.

== Journalism and media ==
Torfs has widely commented on matters related to the Catholic Church. In 1994, he appealed to bishops to use their ius remonstrandi to protest the papal letter ordinatio sacerdotalis which wanted to close the debate on allowing women into priesthood. He subsequently became one of the panel members of the show Canvas from 2002 to 2003. He began a column in De Standaard called The Slippery Slope (Het Hellend Vlak).

In 2004, he gave a series of lectures with reflections on Rubens and modern art in the St. Paul Church in Antwerp. In 2008, he was the guest speaker (alongside minister-president Kris Peeters) on the yearly meeting of the Willem-Elsschot Society. In 2008, he was the guest speaker of the Bomans Society in the Netherlands. He was the host of the Belgian Sports Personality of the Year in 2009.

He later became a weekly columnist for Le Soir from 2008 to 2009. Torfs was brought in several times as a guest on De Laatste Show (The Last Show) a talk show on Eén a public Dutch TV station in Belgium, owned by the VRT. Torfs soon became a frequent guest on some of Flanders' media's prime-time shows, including De Zevende Dag, Terzake, Zinzen, De Pappenheimers, Nachtwacht, Recht van Antwoord. In 2009 Torfs was a co-presenter with Siegfried Bracke in a television program devoted to covering Belgian elections called De Stemming. Between 2007 and 2009, he had his own 'conversation' program at Canvas called Nooitgedacht (Never Thought), a series of 30 in-depth conversations with notable guests, including Wilfried Martens, Guy Verhofstadt, Louis Michel, Philippe Claudel, Kamagurka and Liesbeth List. Torfs was a one-man jury panel on De Slimste Mens ter Wereld (The Smartest Person on Earth), a Flemish TV program produced by Woestijnvis on Eén. Presented by movie director Erik Van Looy, it features journalists, politicians and performers who are subjected to a daunting quiz. Torfs remarked on the questions, answers, contestants, or the presenter. Vlaamse Televisie Academie awarded it the Vlaamse Televisie Ster voor Beste Entertainmentprogramma. Torfs retired from the program in 2010.

Torfs has published on human rights, marriage and the benefits of forbearance. He is a strong critic yet defender of the Catholic Church. He has been noted for his sharp criticism of the Holy See yet has consistently defended the place of Christianity and the Church in society.

== Politics ==
In October 2009 Torfs told the press that he wanted to bring together people from all walks of life into a new political forum for innovation. He started an informal Think Tank which, if successful, could evolve into a new party for the elections of 2011. However, circumstances in Belgian politics forced new elections scheduled for June 2010.

In May 2010, Torfs was offered the second position on the senate list of the Christian Democratic and Flemish party (CD&V), next to Marianne Thyssen and took it. The press has called Torfs one of the so-called "white rabbits" of Belgian politics 2010. During an interview for De Zevende Dag, Torfs appeared wearing a tie with a white rabbit print on it, which prompted the nickname. As a member of CD&V he aspired to reconceptualize the political ideology of the party together with Inge Vervotte and others. According to Torfs, these attempts failed to broaden the internal debate within the party and didn't give rise to change within the party because of the highly rigid and hierarchical nature of the party system and its decision-making. From this perspective, he started to think about leaving politics in the end of 2012. In March 2013 he quit politics and announced his candidacy to become Rector of KU Leuven.

In 2023, he was awarded the Prize for Liberty by the Flemish classical-liberal think tank Libera!.

== Selected bibliography ==
- Het huwelijk als levensgemeenschap. Een kerkrechtelijke benadering, Leuven, Acco, 1990.
- Mensen en rechten in de Kerk, Leuven, Davidsfonds, 1993.
- De kardinaal heeft verdriet, Leuven, Uitgeverij Van Halewyck, 2002.
- Voor het zinken de kerk uit, Leuven, Uitgeverij Van Halewyck, 2004.
- Religie, vrede en onvrede, Gent, Larcier, 2005.
- Lof der lankmoedigheid, Leuven, Uitgeverij Van Halewyck, 2006.
- Het hellend vlak, Leuven, Uitgeverij Van Halewyck, 2008.
- Wie gaat er dan de wereld redden?, Van Halewyck, 2009. (Liberales prize winner 2009)
