= Herman De Dijn =

Belgian university teacher (born 1943)

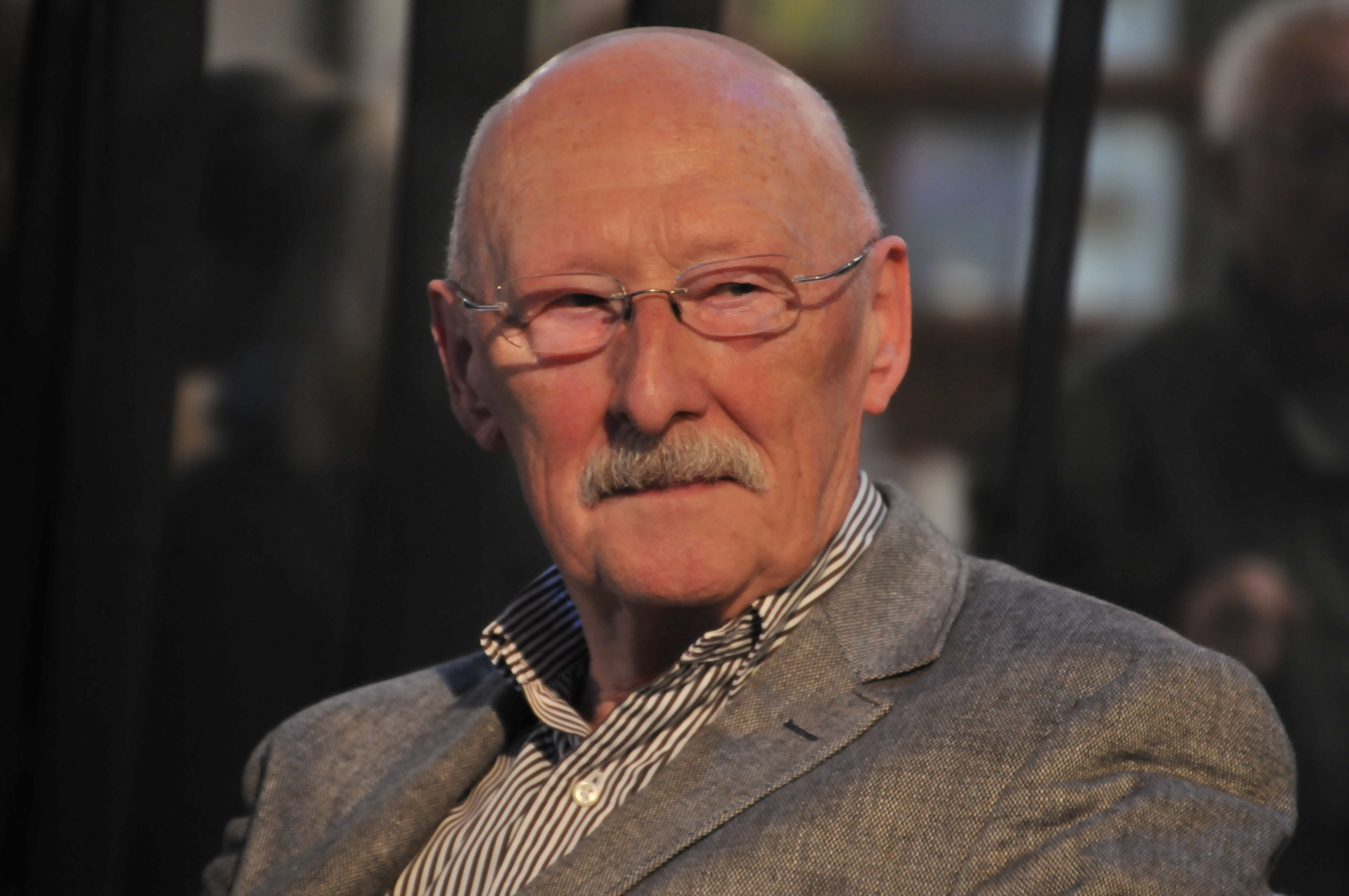
2018

Herman De Dijn (born 1943) is a Belgian academic philosopher and historian of philosophy with a particular interest in the ethics of Spinoza, known as a public intellectual in both Belgium and the Netherlands.

== Life ==
De Dijn was born in Galmaarden in 1943 and was educated at the Sint-Catharinacollege, Geraardsbergen. He studied at the KU Leuven, graduating Doctor of Philosophy in 1971. After postdoctoral study at the University of Cambridge he was appointed to the Institute of Philosophy, KU Leuven, where he was a full professor from 1979 until 2008, when he became professor emeritus. From 1995 to 2000 he was vice-rector of human sciences.

His emphasis on the importance of community and tradition in contrast to individualism has given him the reputation of a conservative thinker.

== Publications ==
=== As author ===
- Methode en waarheid bij Spinoza (Leiden, 1975)
- Einstein en Spinoza (Delft, 1991)
- Spinoza: The Way to Wisdom (Purdue University Press, 1996)
- Progres et traditions: figures et coupures de la modernité (Paris, 2003)
- Modernité et tradition: essais sur l'entre-deux (Paris, 2004)
- Spinoza: de doornen en de roos (Kapellen, 2009)
- De affecten en het ethische leven: Spinoza's radicaal nieuwe visie op ethiek als een natuurlijk fenomeen (Voorschoten, 2011)
- Spinoza en Galilei: een confrontatie (Voorschoten, 2014)
- Rituelen: Waarom we niet zonder kunnen (Antwerp, 2018)

=== As editor ===
- Spinoza and Hobbes, edited by M. Bertman, H. De Dijn, M. Walther (Hannover, 1986)
- Spinoza's Philosophy of Religion, edited by H. De Dijn, F. Mignini, P. van Rooden (Würzburg, 1996)
