= Catherine Verfaillie =

Belgian molecular biologist

Catherine M. Verfaillie (Flemish: [kaːtəˈrinə vərˈfɑi]; born 1957 in Ypres) is a Belgian molecular biologist. After obtaining an M.D. from the Catholic University of Leuven (KU Leuven) in 1982, she specialized in internal medicine in 1987. She currently she works as a biologist and a professor at KU Leuven. Her work on the ability of adult stem cells to differentiate to different cell types has garnered controversy due to accusations of poor laboratory practices and fabrication of data by members of her laboratory. In 2019, it was shown that several of her more recent papers also contained altered images and potential fraud was committed. An investigation by the KU Leuven Commission on Research Integrity, finished in July 2020, concluded that there was no breach of research integrity in the investigated publications, but that some papers did contain inaccurate figures.

== Career ==
After her specialization in internal medicine she departed for the United States as a research fellow at the University of Minnesota where she worked in the lab of Phillip McGlave in hematopoiesis and stromal control of hematopoietic stem cells, in 1991 becoming a professor in the Department of Medicine, becoming a full professor in 1997. Verfaillie later became the director of the Stem Cell Institute at the University of Minnesota (U.S.) from 1998 until 2006. In a widely noted paper in 2002, she claimed a specific type of adult-derived stem cells (termed multipotent adult progenitor cells (MAPC)). She is a Professor of Medicine in the Division of Hematology, Oncology and Transplantation of the University of Minnesota's Medical School. She holds the Anderson Chair in Stem Cell Biology and the McKnight's Presidential Chair in Stem Cell Biology. She now leads the Stamcel Instituut te Leuven (SCIL, Stem Cell Institute Leuven) at the Katholieke Universiteit Leuven in Leuven, Belgium. She is a member of the Advisory Board of the Itinera Institute think-tank.

== Controversy and aftermath over stem cell falsification ==
The report on the ability of adult stem cells to differentiate to different cell types was immediately sensational in scientific circles given that it was the first report of adult-derived stem cells to have properties previously ascribed to embryonic stem cell only. The report was immediately also heralded by conservative lawmakers opposed to embryonic stem cell research as proof that such research is not needed. Skepticism surrounded the announcement from the beginning: Stuart Orkin from the Harvard Medical School noted, "If the cells are what she says -- and I have no reason to dispute that but no one has demonstrated it yet -- it's pretty remarkable. For people interested in tissue regeneration, this would be the cell to work with."

Verfaillie was noted to immediately benefit from the interest in adult stem cells with her lab size and funding immediately doubling. The discovery was considered so ground-breaking that she received several accolades in the first few years after the initial report. New Scientist, a popular science magazine covering all aspects of science and technology, declared it as the "ultimate stem cell discovery". Problems with working with MAPCs proved difficult to several laboratories who were keen to co-operate in expanding the use of MAPCs. In a report in Nature, Dr. Rudolf Jaenisch at MIT was quoted by Nature stating that "I have not seen any convincing data showing that anyone has repeated the chimaera experiment, so I don't think this part of it is true", referring to the claim by Verfaillie that MAPCs when injected into mouse embryos contribute to all tissues.

The same article also quoted Orkin as saying that the material transfer agreement (MTA) for procuring these cells were so restrictive that his group refused to work with them. First reports on potential problems with Verfaillie's group's work came in early 2007 when New Scientist reported that the 2002 Nature paper had some of the images appear in a second paper published at about the same time. The article also revealed duplication of images in a 2001 paper on blood, authored by Verfaillie's trainee, Morayma Reyes, and that a patent application for the MAPCs was licensed to a company called Athersys, based in Cleveland, Ohio. A series of investigations into at least three instances of data duplication/fabrication by the University of Minnesota followed, which eventually concluded in October 2008 that Morayma Reyes had fabricated data in the 2001 paper.

The panel criticized Verfaillie's laboratory for “poor scientific method and inadequate training and oversight for this research”. It contacted Blood and asked the journal to retract the paper. The investigators also found discrepancies with images in a second paper from Verfaillie's laboratory, published in the Journal of Clinical Investigation in 2002. Those problems did not rise to the level of academic misconduct, the university said. It did not find fault directly with Verfaillie, but Tim Mulcahy concluded that the “message here is that everyone needs to fulfill their responsibility to the public and to science”.

In response to the investigation at the University of Minnesota, Nature instituted their own investigation to the 2002 controversial paper and Verfaillie was allowed to make a Corrigendum to the original paper, which did not acknowledge fabrication of data, and claimed that the original observation still held. The issue raised by Rudolf Jaenisch and others regarding the non-reproducibility of the blastocyst injection data was not addressed by the reviewers of Verfaillie. In early 2010, a third paper by the group in the American Journal of Cell Physiology was withdrawn due to "data presented have now been shown to be unreliable. This was again prompted by an investigation by New Scientist.

In 2024 her controversial 2002 paper got retracted.

== Aftermath of scandal and return to Belgium ==
Verfaillie moved to the Katholieke Universiteit Leuven at the height of the controversy in 2006 but retained her position at the University of Minnesota. She has continued to defend her work and gave a list of publications that have proven the utility of MAPCs, albeit without addressing the criticisms of how the key parts of her work could not be reproduced by other labs. In 2007, she collaborated with Irving Weissman at Stanford University to demonstrate that MAPCs could produce blood cells although she did not address the key claims of her original 2002 paper.

Verfaillie is on the editorial board of journals such as Experimental Hematology and PLOS one.

== Awards and honours ==
- Damasheck-prize (2002)
- José Carreras award (2003)
- Lección Conmemorativa Jiménez Díaz Prize (2004)
- Vlerick Award (2005)
