= Astrid van Oyen =

Archaeologist

Astrid van Oyen is currently professor of archaeology at Radboud University, Nijmegen. She is a leading archaeologist studying the social, economic and cultural aspects of empire, rural economies, craft production, and storage in Italy and the western provinces.

== Education ==
Van Oyen gained her BA and MA in archaeology at University of Leuven, Belgium. She received a PhD in classics in 2014 from the University of Cambridge, with a thesis titled 'Rethinking terra sigillata: an archaeological application of Actor-Network Theory', which was supervised by Martin Millett.

== Career ==
Van Oyen was a Junior Research Fellow at Homerton College, University of Cambridge from 2013 to 2016. In 2016 Van Oyen joined Cornell University as an assistant professor in classics. In 2019, she was an External Faculty Fellow, Stanford Humanities Centre at Stanford.

Van Oyen has published a series of books. How Things Make History, published in 2016, traces the historical trajectories of terra sigillata pottery in the Roman empire, and was described as "a very welcome study opening up new approaches to the analysis of ancient ceramics, or material culture in general." In 2017, she co-edited Materialising Roman Historieswith Martin Pitts, exploring how historical narratives are constructed through artefacts, which was described as having "a coherence that one rarely finds in volumes resulting from seminars...". Her 2020 publication The Socio-Economics of Roman Storage examined the practice and implications of storage in the western Mediterranean and in a review Caroline Cheung described it as "a book that offers so much food for thought that will inspire new avenues of research for years to come." Conor Trainor in The Classical Review praised its accessible writing, despite a complex topic.

Van Oyen co-directs the Marzuolo Archaeological Project with Gijs Tol and Rhodora Vennarucci, which is excavating the rural multi-craft site of Marzuolo, Tuscany.

In 2011, she was appointed as an associate editor of the Journal of Roman Archaeology.

In July 2024 she was elected as a Fellow of the Society of Antiquaries of London.

== Selected publications ==
=== Books ===
- Van Oyen, A. 2016. How Things Make History: The Roman Empire and its Terra Sigillata Pottery. Amsterdam: Amsterdam University Press.
- Van Oyen, A. and Pitts, M. 2016 (eds). Materialising Roman Histories. Oxford: Oxbow.
- Van Oyen, A. 2020. The Socio-Economics of Roman Storage: Agriculture, Trade, and Family. Cambridge: Cambridge University Press.

=== Journal articles ===
- Van Oyen, A. 2020. Innovation and investment in the Roman rural economy through the lens of Marzuolo (Tuscany, Italy). Past & Present 248: pp. 3–40.
- Van Oyen, A. 2019. Rural time. World Archaeology 51(2): pp. 191–207.
- Van Oyen, A. 2016. Historicising material agency: from relations to relational constellations. Journal of Archaeological Method and Theory 23: pp. 354–378.
- Van Oyen, A. 2015. The moral architecture of villa storage in Italy in the 1st c. BC. Journal of Roman Archaeology 28: pp. 97–123.
- Van Oyen, A. 2015. The Roman city as articulated through terra sigillata. Oxford Journal of Archaeology 34: pp. 279–299.
