= Mark Waer =

Belgian physician and biomedical scientist

Rector of KU Leuven
- In office 1 August 2009 – 31 July 2013
- Preceded by: Marc Vervenne
- Succeeded by: Rik Torfs

Personal details
- Born: 10 March 1951 (age 75) Leuven, Belgium
- Profession: Professor of Immunology
- Website: Markwaer.be
- Scientific career
- Education: Katholieke Universiteit Leuven
- Awards: NATO Award for Medical Research, Fulbright Hays Award for Medical Research
- Fields: Immunology, Nephrology
- Workplaces: Katholieke Universiteit Leuven
- Thesis: Immunological effects of fractionated total lymphoid irradiation on the induction of transplantation tolerance and in the treatment of autoimmune disorders

Mark Jozef Albert, Baron Waer (born 10 March 1951) is a Belgian physician, biomedical scientist, and former Rector of the Katholieke Universiteit Leuven.

== Biography ==
From 1969 to 1976, Waer studied medicine at the Katholieke Universiteit Leuven in Leuven. In 1981, he was qualified the Specialist of Internal Medicine in nephrology. In 1983, he obtained PhD in medical sciences.

From 1983 to 1985, Waer was a postdoctoral research fellow at the Stanford University School of Medicine. In 1992, he was promoted to professor at KU Leuven faculty of medicine, where he specialised in nephrology and immunology. In 1994, he was pointed the Director of Laboratory for Experimental Transplantation at KU Leuven. From 1998 to 2005, Waer was the Medical Director of KU Leuven's teaching hospitals. Since 2006, he has been the Chairman of the University Hospitals of KU Leuven. He was also a vice-rector of the Biomedical Sciences Group of KU Leuven.

On 8 May 2009, he was elected the rector of the Katholieke Universiteit Leuven. He assumed office on 1 August that year.
