= Marc Vervenne =

Belgian theologian

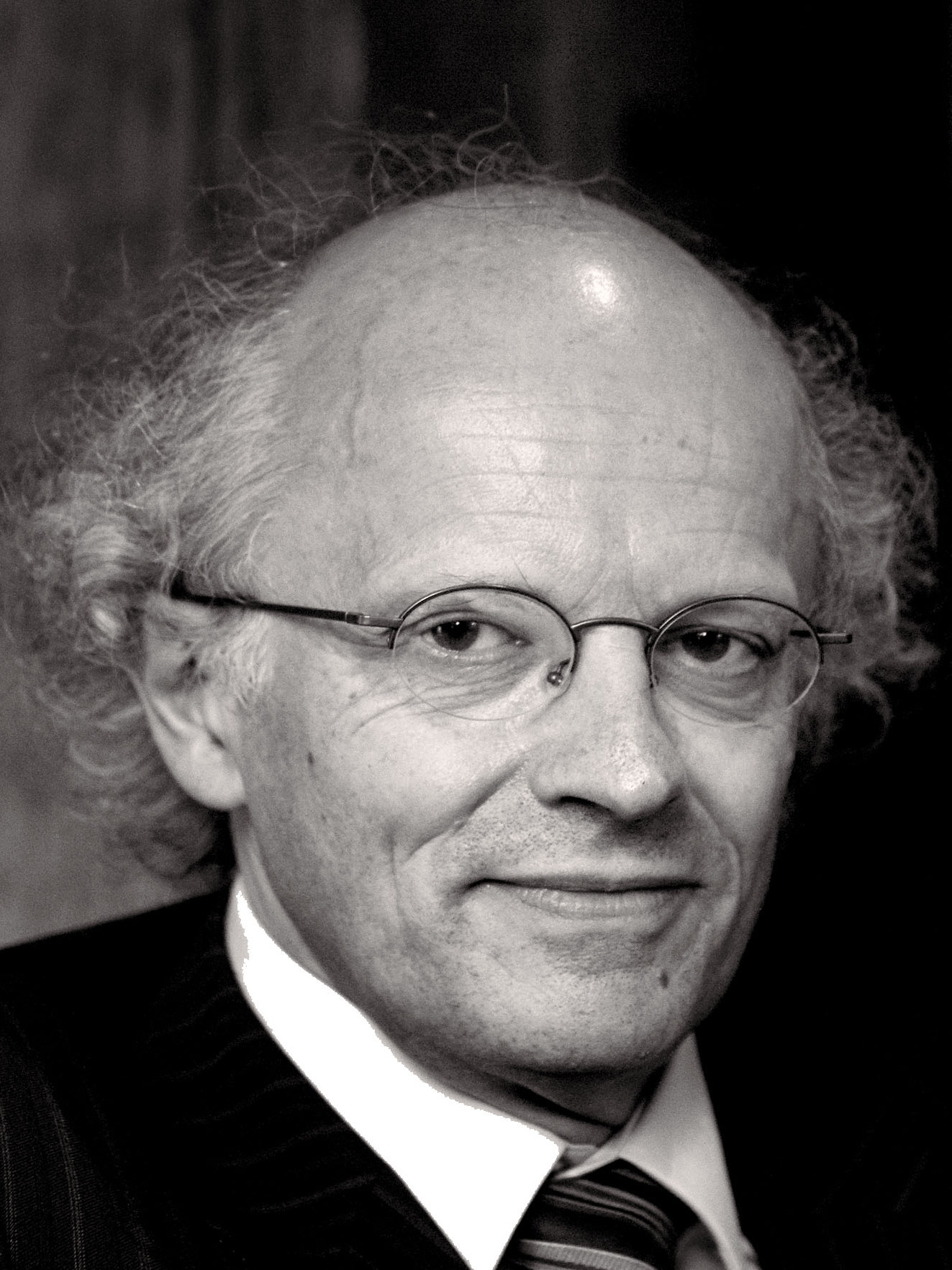

Rector of KU Leuven
- In office 1 August 2005 – 31 July 2009
- Preceded by: André Oosterlinck
- Succeeded by: Mark Waer

Personal details
- Born: 16 April 1949 (age 77) Ypres, Belgium
- Education: Katholieke Universiteit Leuven
- Profession: Professor of Biblical studies
- Website: www.marcvervenne.be

Marc Vervenne (born 16 April 1949) is a Belgian theologian.

From August 2005 till July 2009 he was the rector of the Katholieke Universiteit Leuven. In 2005, he won the elections for new rector in the third round on Tuesday 24 May 2005 by beating Rik Torfs with 50.81% to 49.19%. Before becoming rector, he was vice-rector of the Human sciences group. On 3 December 2008 the university announced that he would not serve a second term. On 1 August 2009 Mark Waer became the new rector.

== Early life ==
Born in Ypres, Belgium, Vervenne first went to the seminary to become a priest, but quit in 1973. He then started work in the construction industry as lorry driver. Later, he studied theology in Leuven and in 1986 he received his PhD in theology. He's a specialist of the Old Testament. He is visiting scholar at the universities of Lille (France) and Kinshasa (Congo).

Marc Vervenne is married to Christine De Roo and they have three children: Hannes (1978), Hilke (1980) and Bastiaan (1983).
