= Rosebud Kurwijila =

Tanzanian politician

Rosebud Violet Kurwijila, of Tanzania, is the African Union's Commissioner for Rural Economy and Agriculture. She previously had been Program Development Coordinator for ACTIONAID in Tanzania. She was Chair of the Tanzania Agricultural Development Bank.

== Biography ==
She holds a bachelor's degree in agriculture from Sokoine University of Agriculture, Tanzania (1976), Master's degree in Agricultural Economics from the University of London (1983) as well as a Master of Philosophy in Development Economics from the University of East Anglia (1994).

During her career, she has served on many occasions as consultant in various areas related to Agriculture, Rural Economy and Food Security. From 1995 – 1997, she was a senior consultant in a consultancy firm where she dealt with projects acquisition and projects execution.

She has published a wide range of articles in international journals on food security, rural economy, agricultural technology and other related issues.

She has four sons. Her husband, Professor Lusato Kurwijila, died in Morogoro, Tanzania, on 8 August 2021.
