= Reuters - The World's Most Innovative Universities =

Annual university ranking

Reuter's - The World's Most Innovative Universities
- Categories: Higher education
- Frequency: Annual
- Publisher: Reuters
- First issue: 2015 (Last updated in 2019)
- Country: United Kingdom
- Language: English
- Website: World Ranking; Europe Ranking

The World's Most Innovative Universities by Reuters is an annual empirical ranking that identifies educational institutions doing the most to advance science, invent technologies and power new markets.

== Ranking ==
Empirical metrics focus on how often a university's patent applications are granted, how many patents are filed with global patent offices and local authorities, and how often a university's patents were cited by others.

The process identifies the 600 academic and government organizations with the greatest number of scholarly journal as indexed in the Web of Science. This list is then cross referenced against the patents and patent equivalents each university filed in the Derwent World Patents Index and the Derwent Innovations Index.

== Scope ==
The ranking has a European edition featuring the top 100 institutions across that region, an Asia-Pacific edition featuring the top 75 institutions and an edition featuring the top 25 most innovative governmental institutions in the world.

According to the World Economic Forum, universities on this list produce original research, create useful technology, and stimulate the global economy.
