= Sokoine University of Agriculture =

Public university in Morogoro, Tanzania

- Chuo Kikuu cha Sokoine cha Kilimo (Swahili)
- Motto: Ardhi ni Hazina (Swahili)
- Motto in English: Land is Treasure
- Type: Public
- Established: 1984; 42 years ago
- Affiliations: AAU, ACU
- Chairman: Hon.Mohamed Chande Othman
- Chancellor: Hon. Joseph Sinde Warioba
- Vice-Chancellor: Prof. Raphael Tihelwa Chibunda
- Location: Morogoro, Tanzania; 6°51′5″S 37°39′26″E
- Colors: Green and Yellow
- Website: University Website

Sokoine University of Agriculture (SUA) is a public university in Morogoro, Tanzania, specializing in agriculture. The university is named after the country's second prime minister Edward Sokoine.

Historically, SUA traces its roots to 1965 when it emerged as a program of the then-international University of East Africa. When that was dissolved in 1970, the Tanzanian agriculture program fell under the purview of the University of Dar es Salaam. Finally, it was spun off as a university in its own right in 1984.

SUA has five campuses, and contains five academic colleges and two schools. It provides bachelor's, master's, and PhDs in a variety of fields, many of which center around agriculture. At least two Tanzanian politicians have been affiliated with the university.

== Introduction ==
Sokoine University of Agriculture was established on 1 July 1984 by Parliamentary Act No. 6 of 1984. Currently the University operates under the Universities Act No. 7 of 2005 and SUA Charter and Rules of 2007.

== History ==
The university traces its roots back to 1965 in Morogoro, where it initially began as an agriculture college offering diploma training in agricultural practices. After the dissolution of the East African Community in 1970, the University of East Africa, which was the only university in East Africa offering agriculture degrees in the region, was also dissolved. This led the Government of Tanzania to create a domestic institution, which led to the establishment of the Faculty of Agriculture at the University of Dar es Salaam. Sokoine Agriculture College fell under this umbrella and under the mandate of the University of Dar es Salaam, started to offer Bachelors of Science in Agriculture.

Further progress continued to develop in the Faculty of Agriculture; in 1974 the Division of Forestry was established and in 1976 the division of veterinary science was established. This led to the faculty's renaming to the "Faculty of Agriculture, Forestry and Veterinary Sciences". With growing enrollment numbers, the parliament decided to separate the faculty and create a fully fledged university to help boost agriculture growth in the country. Through Parliamentary Act No. 6 of 1984, the faculty was then transformed into a university and today is known as Sokoine University of Agriculture.

== Campuses ==
Sokoine University of Agriculture (Tanzania)

The University has five campuses, namely:

- Edward Moringe Campus (2,376 ha) in Morogoro
- Solomon Mahlangu Campus (1,050 ha), also in Morogoro
- Olmotonyi Campus (840 ha) in Arusha
- Mazumbai Campus (320 ha) in Tanga Region
- Mizengo Pinda Campus in Katavi Region (64 ha)
- and Tunduru Campus (509 ha) in Ruvuma Region.

In addition, SUA has sites for students’ field practice in Mbinga, Ruvuma Region; Mgeta (Nyandira), Morning side and Kitulanghalo Forest in Morogoro Region.

SUA has four mandates: Training, Research, Consultancy and Outreach. SUA offers training that lead to awards of certificates, diplomas, bachelors, masters, and doctorates. Non-degree programmes include Diploma in Information and Library Science, Diploma in Records, Archives and Information Management, Diploma in Animal Health and Production, Diploma in Laboratory Technology and Diploma in Information Technology.

The Sokoine National Agricultural Library is SUA's Library and the Tanzania National Agricultural Library. The library provides services to the university community and other stakeholders in the agricultural and related sectors.

== Colleges and Schools ==
The University has five campus colleges and two schools, namely;

1. College of Agriculture;
2. College of Forestry, Wildlife and Tourism;
3. College of Veterinary Medicine and Biomedical Sciences;
4. College of Social Sciences and Humanities
5. College of Natural and Applied Sciences;
6. College of Economics and Business Studies;
7. School of Engineering and Technology; and
8. School of Education.

These colleges and Schools offers various degree and non-degree programmes which lead to the awards of PhD, Masters, Bachelor degree, Diploma, and Certificate qualifications

== Study Programmes ==
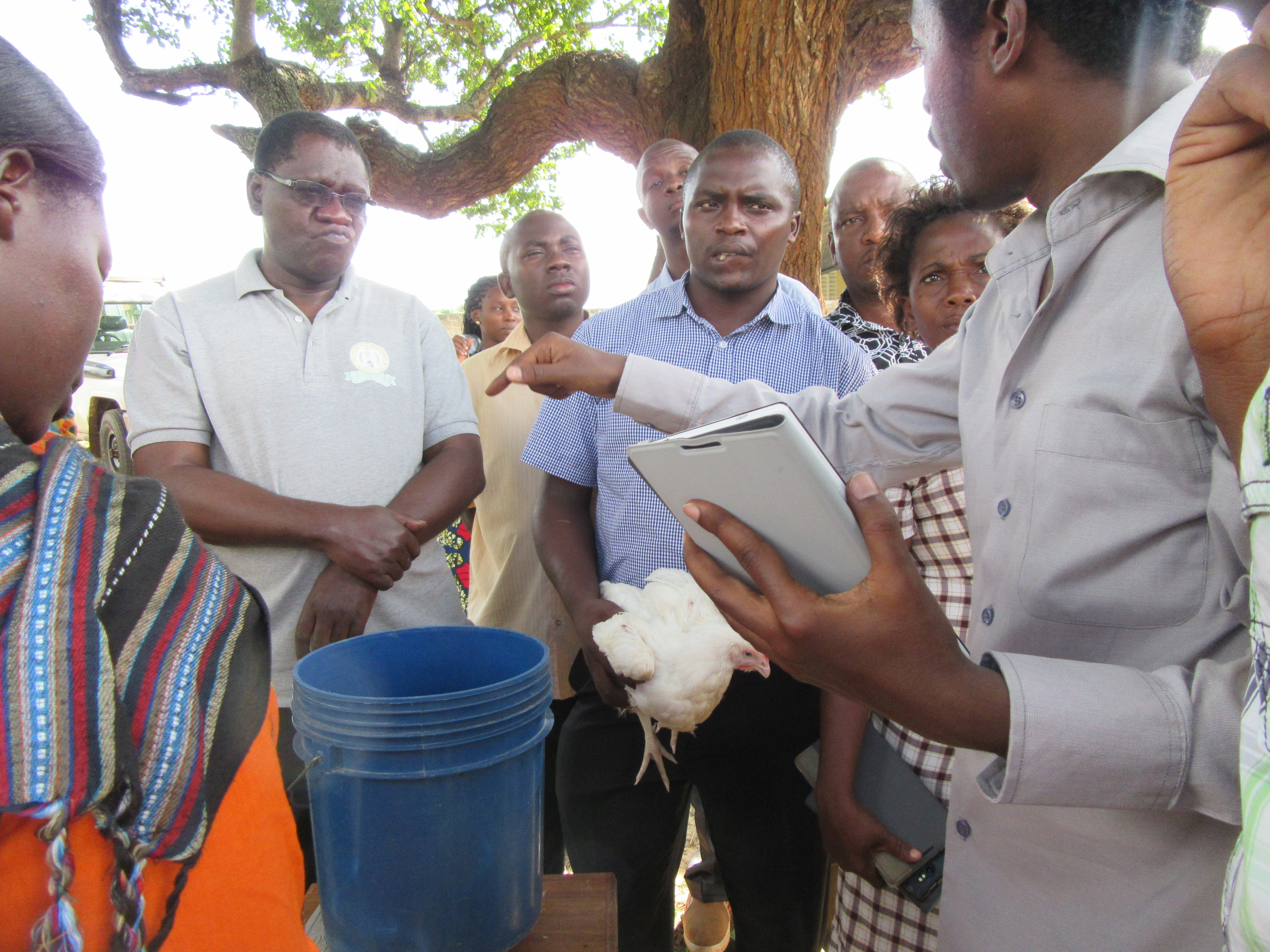
An outdoor poultry demonstration at Sokoine University of Agriculture.

=== Undergraduate Programmes ===
Sokoine University of Agriculture (SUA) offers 39 Bachelor degree programmes, 6 Diploma programmes and 2 Certificates through Colleges, Schools and Departments. The following are the list of all undergraduate programmes leading to the awards of Bachelor degree, Diploma and Certificate qualifications offered at SUA in each academic unit.

College of Agriculture

1. Bachelor of Science in Agriculture General
2. Bachelor of Science in Horticulture
3. Bachelor of Science in Crop Production and Management
4. Bachelor of Science in Agronomy
5. Bachelor of Science in Animal Science
6. Bachelor of Science in Aquaculture
7. Bachelor of Science in Range Management
8. Bachelor of Community Development
9. Bachelor of Science in Applied Agricultural Extension
10. Bachelor of Science in Family & Consumer Sciences
11. Bachelor of Science in Human Nutrition

College of Forestry, Wildlife and Tourism

1. Bachelor of Science in Forestry
2. Bachelor of Science in Wildlife Management
3. Bachelor of Science in Wood Technologies and Value Addition
4. Bachelor of Tourism Management

College of Economics and Business Studies

1. Bachelor of Science in Agricultural Economics and Agribusiness
2. Bachelor of Agricultural Investment and Banking

College of Veterinary Medicine and Biomedical Sciences

1. Bachelor of Veterinary Medicine
2. Bachelor of Science in Biotechnology and Laboratory Sciences
3. Diploma in Laboratory Technology
4. Diploma in Tropical Animal Health and Production

College of Social Sciences and Humanities

1. Bachelor of Rural Development
2. Bachelor of Arts in Development Planning and Management

College of Natural and Applied Sciences (CONAS)

1. Bachelor of Science in Environmental Sciences and Management
2. Bachelor of Science in Information Technology
3. Bachelor of Information and Records Management
4. Bachelor of Science with Education (Agricultural Sciences and Biology)
5. Bachelor of Science with Education (Chemistry and Biology)
6. Bachelor of Science with Education (Chemistry and Mathematics)
7. Bachelor of Science with Education (Geography and Biology)
8. Bachelor of Science with Education (Geography and Mathematics)
9. Bachelor of Science with Education (Informatics and Mathematics)
10. Bachelor of Science with Education (Physics and Chemistry)
11. Bachelor of Science with Education (Physics and Mathematics)
12. Bachelor of Science with Education (Physics and Geography)
13. Bachelor of Science with Education (Physics and Information Technology)
14. Diploma in Records, Archives and Information Management
15. Diploma in Information and Library Science
16. Diploma in Information Technology
17. Certificate in Information Technology

School of Engineering Science and Technology

1. Bachelor of Science in Agricultural Engineering
2. Bachelor of Science in Irrigation and Water Resources Engineering
3. Bachelor of Science in Bioprocessing and Post harvest Engineering
4. Bachelor of Science in Food Science and Technology

Mizengo Pinda Campus College - Katavi

1. Bachelor of Science in Bee Resources Management
2. Diploma in Crop Production and Management
3. Certificate in Tour Guide and Hunting Operations

=== Postgraduate Programmes ===
Sokoine University of Agriculture offers Postgraduate Diploma, Master's and Ph.D. Programmes in all academic units as follows

College of Agriculture

1. Master of Science in Crop Science
2. Master of Science in Crop Protection
3. Master of Science in Seed Technology and Business
4. Master of Science in Horticulture
5. Master of Science in Tropical Animal Production
6. Master of Science in Aquaculture
7. Master of Science in Soil Science and Land Management
8. Master of Science in Human Nutrition
9. Master of Science in Agricultural Extension
10. Master of Science in Agricultural Statistics
11. PhD in Soil and Water Management (Course work and Research)
12. PhD Agro-Ecology (Course work and Research)
13. PhD in Agricultural and Rural Innovation (PhD ARI) by Coursework and Research

College of Veterinary Medicine and Biomedical Sciences

1. Master of Preventive Veterinary Medicine
2. Master of Science in Public Health and Food Safety
3. Master Science in Public Health Pest Management
4. Master of Science in Health of Aquatic Animal Resources
5. Master of Science in Applied Microbiology
6. Master of Science in Animal Reproduction and Biotechnology
7. Master of Science in Molecular Biology and Biotechnology
8. Master of Veterinary Surgery
9. Master of Science in One Health Molecular Biology
10. Master of Science in Parasitology
11. PhD in Veterinary Medicine and Biomedical Sciences

College of Natural and Applied Sciences

1. Master of Science with Education (Mathematics)
2. Master of Science with Education (Biology)
3. Master of Science with Education (Chemistry)
4. Master of Science in Analytical Chemistry by Research
5. Master of Science in Phytochemistry
6. PhD in Analytical Chemistry by Research
7. PhD in Phytochemistry by Research
8. PhD in Phytomedicine by Research
9. PhD in Mathematics
10. PhD in Library Studies
11. PhD in Geography and Environmental Studies

College of Forestry, Wildlife and Tourism

1. Postgraduate Diploma in Result-based Monitoring and Evaluation
2. Master of Science in Wildlife Management and Conservation
3. Master of Science in Forest Engineering
4. Master of Science in Management of Natural Resources for Sustainable Agriculture
5. Master of Science in Forest Products and Technology
6. Master of Science in Forestry
7. Master of Science in Agroforestry
8. Master of Science in Ecosystems Science and Management
9. Master of Science in Forest Resources Assessment and Management
10. PhD in Forest Sciences

College of Social Sciences and Humanities

1. Master of Arts in Rural Development
2. Master of Arts in Project Management and Evaluation
3. Master of Arts in Development Planning and Policy Analysis
4. PhD in Policy Planning and Management
5. PhD in Rural Development

College of Economics and Business Studies

1. Postgraduate Diploma in Agricultural Economics
2. Master of Science in Agricultural Economics
3. Master of Science in Agricultural and Applied Economics
4. Master of Business Administration (MBA) – Agribusiness
5. Master of Business Administration – Evening Programme
6. PhD in Agribusiness (Course work and research)
7. PhD in Agricultural Economics (Research)

School of Engineering and Technology

1. Master of Science in Post Harvest Engineering and Management
2. Master of Science in Agricultural Engineering
3. Master of Science in Irrigation Engineering and Management
4. Master of Science in Land Use Planning Management
5. Master of Science in Food Science
6. Master of Science in Food Quality and Safety Assurance

School of Education

1. Postgraduate Diploma in Education
2. Master of Educational Curriculum and Instruction
3. PhD in Education

=== Doctor of Philosophy ===
The University offers PhD programmes by Research and Thesis in all academic units (School and Colleges). Doctorate degrees are offered in various areas of specialization including Doctor of Philosophy (PhD), Postdoctoral Studies, Doctor of Science and the Doctor of honoris causa.

=== In-service programmes ===
The Institute of Continues Education (ICE) in collaboration with faculties, centers and other institutes offers short-term in-service programmes to field and operational staff as well as training and extension services to farmers and community leaders. It also coordinates outreach programmes.

== Notable people ==
- Gerald Misinzo, Tanzanian veterinary virologist and professor, Bachelor of Veterinary Medicine 2000
- Rosebud Kurwijila, Tanzanian politician, bachelor's degree 1976
- Juma Ngasongwa, Tanzanian politician, former lecturer from 1984 to 1993
