= Death of Sanda Dia =

Fraternity hazing death in Belgium

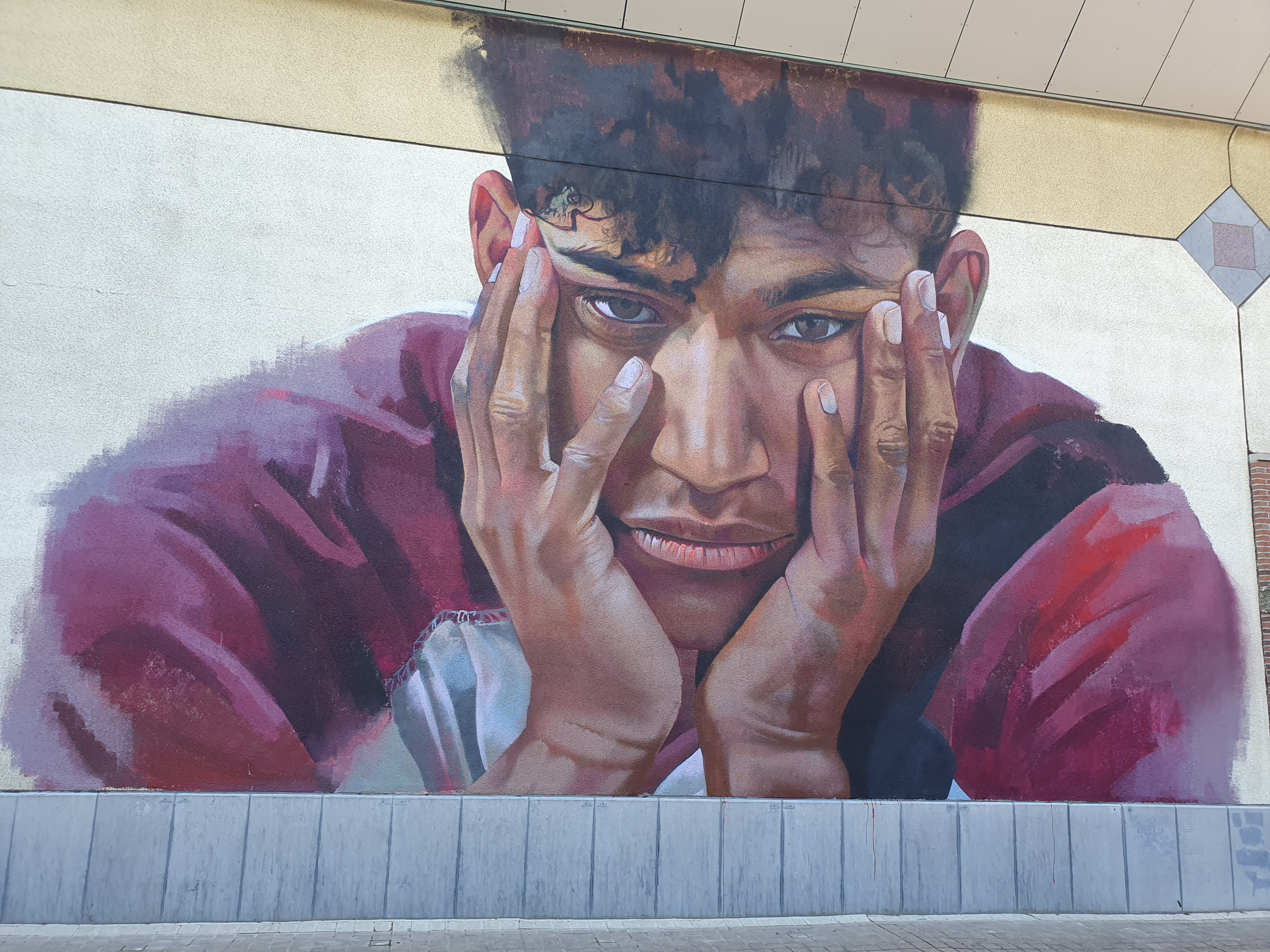
- Mural of Sanda Dia in Leuven (2023)
- Location: Vorselaar, Belgium
- Date: Hazing: 4–5 December 2018; Death: 7 December 2018; c. 8:01–9:25 pm CDT (UTC−5)
- Attack type: Hazing initiation ritual
- Victim: Sanda Dia
- Perpetrator: 18 students
- Verdict: Involuntary manslaughter – guilty
- Convictions: €400 fine each; 200 or 300 hour community service each

Sanda Dia was a Belgian student who died in the Antwerp University Hospital in 2018 as a result of a Reuzegom fraternity hazing ritual in Vorselaar when he was aged 20. He was a student at the Katholieke Universiteit Leuven (known as "KU Leuven").

On 4 and 5 December 2018, Dia was forced to drink fish sauce and over two litres of high content alcohol, was refused water, driven to a lodge and made to dig a hole that would later be filled with freezing water, while being subjected to other humiliating and degrading acts. After collapsing, he was driven to hospital where he died of multiple organ failures two days later. His death was attributed to the salt content in the fish sauce he ingested, and the hypothermia he had succumbed to. The medical doctor and forensic pathologist expert Werner Jacobs told in the Hasselt Court that Dia had several injuries caused by violent acts.

Four years later, the accused were ordered to pay fines of €400 each and were sentenced to 200 or 300 hours of community service by the Antwerp Court of Appeal.

== Sanda Dia ==
Dia was an engineering student from Edegem He was 20 years old at the time of his death. His father was a refugee from Senegal.

He was in good health before his death.

== Hazing and death ==
On 5 December 2018, in a woodland cabin in Vorselaar, as part of a hazing ritual, Dia was obliged to drink copious amounts of alcohol before standing half-naked, outside in the cold, in a pool of freezing water and consuming a live goldfish before being forced to throw it back up by drinking dangerous, lethal amounts of fish sauce. The hazing was a ritual of the Reuzegom fraternity at KU Leuven. After hours in the freezing pool, Dia went into cardiac arrest and collapsed.

Fraternity members drove him in their own car to the nearest local hospital in Malle. A nurse said she had the impression that the young men did not realise how serious his condition was (despite the fact that one of the Reuzegom members present at the hazing was a student in medicine – he however did not assist in helping Dia at any stage). At 21:49, Dia was transferred to the University Hospital of Antwerp, where hospital staff alerted the police.

After the hazing, fraternity members, assisted by parents and ex-members, coordinated the deleting of evidence like text messages and video recordings from their phones and cleaned up the cabin and its surroundings, in an attempt to cover up what had happened. The next day a few members went to clean up Dia’s student room as well, in an attempt to cover as much evidence as possible. When the police arrived at the cabin at 3:53 a.m., on 6 December, the scene had been cleaned.

On 7 December, Dia died of multiple-organ failure.

The coroner attributed his death to salt toxicity, attributable to the consumption of fish sauce. The amount of salt in his body was comparable to a person who drank 4 litres (0.88 imp gal; 1.1 US gal) (1.06 gal) of seawater. This caused acute cerebral edema (swelling of the brain).

== Aftermath ==
The lawyer of Dia's father requested a reconstruction of the events that led to Dia's death; his request was not granted.

KU Leuven initially suspended the students, but permitted them to resume studying later. The Reuzegom fraternity was disbanded after Dia's death.

On 26 May 2023, at the Antwerp Court of Appeal, eighteen students were each found guilty of involuntary manslaughter and degrading. Each of the students was acquitted of other charges, including culpable neglect and administering a harmful substance causing death or illness. They were fined €400 each and required to do community service sentences of 200 or 300 hours each. The students were additionally obliged to pay damages to the Dia family, €15,000 to his father, €8,000 to his brother, and €6,000 to his stepmother. His mother sought and obtained damages of €1. Prosecutors had requested jail sentences for the perpetrators, seeking convictions of between 18 and 50 months.

After a crowd-funding campaign, friends commissioned a mural of Dia.

Protests against the sentencing for those that caused the death of Dia, and class-based justice occurred in Leuven, Antwerp, Brussels, Bruges and Ghent. "Fok Reuzegom" ("Fuck Reuzegom") was painted on a roof near the Leuven railway station. In the Netherlands there were protests in Rotterdam and The Hague, nearby the Belgian Embassy. Public commentary noted that some of the fraternity were the sons of judges and politicians and that their high social class influenced their sentence to be too lenient.

On 22 February 2024, Belgian YouTuber Acid (Nathan Vandergunst) was convicted of cyberstalking after identifying former Reuzegom members associated with Dia's death in a June 2023 YouTube video. He received a three-month suspended prison sentence and a €800 fine. Vandergunst was additionally ordered to pay €20,000 in provisional damages to the parents of Donald de Vinck de Winnezeele, an ex-President of the fraternity.

== Bibliography ==
- Huyberechts, Pieter (7 December 2021). Sanda Dia: De doop die leidde tot de dood (in Dutch). Das Mag Uitgeverij.
- De Coninck, Douglas (1 April 2022). Ontmenselijkt. Pelckmans Uitgevers.
