= Reuzegom =

Flemish student fraternity (1946–2018)

- Founded: February 21, 1946; 80 years ago Catholic University of Leuven
- Type: Social
- Former affiliation: Independent
- Status: Defunct
- Defunct date: 2018
- Scope: Local
- Motto: Ut vivat, crescat et floreat, Reuzegom!
- Colors: Green and White
- Zirkel

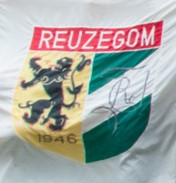
- Flag
- Chapters: 1
- Nickname: Reus, Reuzz
- Headquarters: Leuven; Belgium

Reuzegom (established 1946) was a Flemish fraternity at KU Leuven, part of the Antwerp Guild of student societies (Antwerpse Gilde). It is known for a 2013 case of animal abuse and a 2018 case of psychological and physical abuse of three recruits that resulted in the death of one and the dissolution of the fraternity.

== History ==
The fraternity was founded on 21 February 1946, by Frans De Meester, Remi Verselder, and Hugo Schiltz. The original name of the society was OXACO-Leuven, an abbreviation for "Leuven chapter of Xaverius College Alumni". It grouped students at the Catholic University of Leuven who were alumni of Xaverius College, a secondary school in Borgerhout, Antwerp. In 1957, the name of the society was changed to "Reuzegom", a reference to the reuzekes (little giants) in Borgerhout folklore.

In the seventies, the fraternity grew to be one of the leading fraternities among a dozen societies in the Antwerpse Gilde (the organisation of Antwerp fraternities and sororities in Leuven). At the time of its dissolution in 2018, the club had approximately thirty active members. All members were students of law, engineering, and business engineering at the KU Leuven.

The fraternity was considered elitist, and protected its exclusivity through a tradition of extreme hazing. The fraternity had no black members until 2015. The second person of color to apply died during his initiation in 2018 as a result of abuse by at least eighteen other Reuzegom members.

Following the hazing death of Sanda Dia, Reuzegom was dissolved. As of July 2020, the identity of all Reuzegom members present and past had been moderately successfully removed from the Internet and media. However, the names of the members, alumni, and presidium (the governing members) were public knowledge, with Reuzegom alumni known to hold positions of power and responsibility.

== Symbols ==
The Reuzegom emblem consisted of the Flemish Lion and the green and white house colors. Its motto is Ut vivat, crescat et floreat, Reuzegom!.

== Member misconduct ==
In 2013, animal rights group GAIA complained about the club after a video was leaked in which the fraternity had filmed themselves abusing and killing a piglet as part of the Reuzegom hazing ceremony. No one was charged.

Later in 2013, after the animal cruelty incident, KU Leuven drew up a "hazing charter" to be signed by student societies, fraternities, and sororities, in an attempt to make hazing practices safer. Signing the charter would have been a pledge to notify the city of the place and time of the hazing ceremony, and to abstain from violence, racism, extortion, bullying, sexual assault, discrimination, and the use of vertebrates. Reuzegom, as well as the other fraternities and sororities of the Antwerp Guild, refused. In April 2019, the 28 other fraternities in Leuven signed the charter.

== Death of Sanda Dia ==
In 2018, the male twenty-year-old student Sanda Dia died as a result of the physical abuse he underwent during the two-day-long Reuzegom hazing ritual in Leuven and at a cabin in the woods in Vorselaar. He was admitted to Malle Hospital on 5 December at 9.15 p.m. At arrival, his body temperature was recorded as 27.2 °C (81 °F). He was presented bleeding from nose and mouth, and he was found to have extreme levels of blood salinity resulting from forced consumption of fish sauce and his peers' refusal to let him drink water or soda. A few hours after he arrived in the hospital, Dia died from multiple organ failure. Two other students, who also went through the hazing process were admitted to hospital suffering from hypothermia and the two are civil participants in the on-going criminal case against students of the Reuzegom fraternity who were involved in the hazing.

While Dia was being treated in the hospital, the Reuzegom members, within a few hours, attempted to cover up what had happened by clearing the hut and the surrounding domain in Vorselaar of evidence of the abuse. When a police commissioner arrived at the scene at 4 a.m., he noted that it was "completely clean": not a garbage bag had been left behind. The pit in the ground in which Dia was later proven to have lain unconscious in icy water for hours had been filled in. The members of the club had also attempted to erase their digital traces, but some videos and photos were recovered. They showed Dia unconscious on the ground, a Reuzegom member defecating on someone (Dia or another initiate) in the pit, and the group chanting "Chop off those little hands, the Congo is ours" (a slur celebrating the colonial atrocities committed in the Congo Free State which included mass mutilation of Africans) to a homeless person of color on the street.

Police recovered deleted WhatsApp messages revealing that Reuzegom members, whose parents were "judges, business leaders, and politicians", had scrambled to "cover their tracks" in the wake of the death. No member of the club, past or present, has issued a statement of apology to the family of the victim, either collectively or individually. Initially it was said the students present at the 2018 hazing ceremony would be suspended from the university, this did not happen. Instead, the suspension was replaced with a disciplinary sanction of thirty hours of community service: the possibilities included writing an essay on the history of hazing traditions, providing free tutoring, and attending a holiday program.

=== Judicial investigation and trial ===
The criminal investigation of Sanda Dia's death concluded in July 2020, with a recommendation that Reuzegom members be charged with negligent homicide, humiliation, and premeditated administration of dangerous substances. The judges have evidence of calculated cause and many factors of segregated and more inhumane treatment towards Sanda Dia. The judges have evidence of apartheid as a crime against humanity with this death. Because one Reuzegom member involved in Dia's death is the son of a judge in Antwerp, the case could not be filed in Antwerp: to avoid conflicts of interest, the case was moved to the neighboring province of Limburg. The start of the trial itself, planned for early September, was delayed by a petition for further investigations by five of the accused. Trial lawyer Sven Mary, acting for Sanda Dia's father, stated that it would be better to allow this than to give grounds for a later appeal, but was critical of the last-minute timing.

In May 2023, the members were found guilty of involuntary manslaughter, degrading treatment, and cruelty to animals. They were acquitted of failing to help Dia and of administering a harmful substance causing death or illness, with the court finding that there was no warning on the fish oil bottle and that even doctors may be unaware of the levels of toxic salt consumption.

They were sentenced to between 200 and 300 hours of community service and each fined an amount roughly equivalent to $430.

=== Public opinion ===
After the conclusion of the judicial investigation in July 2020, a reconstruction of the 2018 Reuzegom initiation rite was published, leading to public outcry. The hashtag #JusticeForSanda circulated on social media, encapsulating the concern that if the eighteen Reuzegom members implicated in the events of 2018 were not charged with felonies, they could continue their studies and, like their predecessors, come to occupy positions of power in society and the legal system.

On 4 September 2020, the day the trial was to have opened, a student protest calling for "Justice for Sanda" was held in Leuven, followed the next day by a silent vigil to commemorate Dia.

== See also ==
- Conformity
- Death of Tim Piazza#Criminal prosecutions
- List of hazing deaths in the United States
- Matt's Law
