= List of people from the Vrije Universiteit Brussel =

This is a list of notable people associated with the Vrije Universiteit Brussel, including rectors, faculty, current and former scientists, and alumni.

== Rectors ==
Name	Tenure
Aloïs Gerlo	1969-1974
Roger Van Geen	1974-1978
Bart De Schutter	1978-1982
Oscar Steenhaut	1982-1986
Sylvain Loccufier	1986-1990
Jean Renneboog	1990-1991
Robert Dejaegere	1991-1994
Els Witte	1994-2000
Benjamin Van Camp	2000-2008
Paul De Knop	2008-2016
Caroline Pauwels	2016-2022
Jan Danckaert	2022-?

== Alumni ==
=== Scientists and academics ===
- Diederik Aerts (1953-)
- Leo Apostel (1925-1995)
- Patrick Baert (1961-)
- Gerard Bodifee (1946-)
- Jean Bourgain (1954-2018)
- Ingrid Daubechies (1954-)
- Sophie de Schaepdrijver (1961-)
- Willy Gepts (1922-1991)
- Raymond Hamers (1932-2021)
- Francis Heylighen (1960-)
- Pattie Maes (1961-)
- Christine Van Den Wyngaert (1952-)
- Lode Wyns (1946)

=== Artists ===
- André Delvaux (1926-2002)
- Fabienne Demal (Axelle Red) (1968-)
- Jef Geeraerts (1930-)
- Erik Pevernagie (1939-)

=== Politicians ===
- Bert Anciaux (1959-)
- Karel De Gucht (1954-)
- Patrick Dewael (1955-)
- Christian Leysen (1954-)
- Annemie Neyts (1944-)
- Bruno Tobback (1969-)
- Louis Tobback (1938-)
- Johan Vande Lanotte (1955-)
- Frank Vanhecke (1959-)
- Willy Claes (1938- )
- Upakit Pachariyangkun (1961-)

=== Businesspeople ===
- Tony Mary (1950-)
- François Narmon (1934-2013)

=== Athletes ===
- Sébastien Godefroid (1971-), Olympic sailor
