= Vanistendael =

Vanistendael is a Belgian surname. It may refer to:

- August Vanistendael (1917-2003), Belgian trade union leader and Catholic social activist
- Frans Vanistendael (1942-2021), Belgian expert on tax law and former professor
- Judith Vanistendael (born 1974), Belgian comics author, illustrator
