= Dubrulle =

Dubrulle is a French surname. Notable people with the surname include:

- Aimé Dubrulle (1826–1884), French architect
- Bérengère Dubrulle (born 1965), French astrophysicist
- Louis Dubrulle (1821–1890), French politician
- Manuel Dubrulle (born 1972), French badminton player
- Mark Dubrulle (born 1943), Belgian consultant and environmentalist
- Roland Dubrulle (1907–1983), French architect

== See also ==
- Dubrulle International Culinary and Hotel Institute of Canada, now part of LaSalle College Vancouver
