= Sylvain Plasschaert =

Belgian economist and law professor

Sylvain Plasschaert (born 13 May 1929) is a former Belgian professor in law. He was a member of the Coudenberg group, a Belgian federalist think tank.

== Education ==
He holds a Bachelor in Philosophy, Doctor of Law and Economics, and Master of Law.

== Career ==
He worked as fiscal economist at the World Bank from 1961 until 1965 and was Submanager at the Banque de Bruxelles (Brussels and Antwerp) from 1965 until 1971. Until October 1994, he worked as Professor at the University Faculties St Ignatius (UFSIA) of the University of Antwerp (Full-time, 1971–1994) and at the Katholieke Universiteit Leuven (Part-time, 1965–99). For the EU funded Research Project Govecor (2001–2004) he co-wrote the national reports for Belgium. He is currently Advisory Board Member of the prestigious think tank the European Institute for Asian Studies.

Missions:

As staff member of the World Bank

-India, 1962 : 'report on Indian tax structure, at the level of the States (= fiscal federalism)‘: 3 months in the field

-Mexico, 1963 : ‘ domestic resource mobilisation', within a large mission; 2 months in the field, 1965, 'assessing the state of public finances and, 1967, one month 'assessment of the recent tax reform'

-Turkey, 1963, seconded to the OECD, 'the public finance and the monetary sectors'; within a review of the Turkish development plan;, -one month in the field;

-assisting the head of mission, Prof. Berrill, at King's College, Cambridge, two weeks

-Portugal, 1964, as member of a joint World Bank-IMF technical assistance mission, led by Prof. Erik Lundberg (Stockholm), 'on monetary and budgetary matters': tax reform proposals'; 3 months in the field

As consultant

-Senegal, 1972, for World Bank : 'analysis of the tax system and proposals for reform', 1982, for World Bank : 'public finances ‘

-Algeria, 1972, for World Bank : 'domestic resource mobilization ‘

-Sudan, 1974, for IMF : ‘ fiscal relations between central and provincial governments ‘

-Rapporteur about ‘ transfer pricing ‘ at Colloquy of the Council of Europe, Strasbourg, 1980 on 'international tax evasion and avoidance'

-Economic Development Institute of the World Bank, Washington, 1981: drafting of a case-study on Theobroma, a fictional African country, about 'structural adjustment problems ‘ (in French)

-Trinidad and Cameroon, 1982, for the UN Centre for Transnational Corporations: seminars on 'transfer pricing’and 'tax incentives'

-Indonesia, for UN Centre on Transnational Corporations : -1984, analysis of 'transfer pricing problems' -1986, 'transfer pricing problems in the oil sector ‘

-Jamaica, April, for the EEC Commission (mission chief): -1982, 'study of tax system, with a view to its computerisation ‘; -1984: follow-up mission

-Belgian member of a group of experts for the European Commission, 1984-86: 'financing infrastructural investments'

-Morocco, 1986, within World Bank mission : ‘ tax policies ‘ (with reform proposals)

-Burundi, 1990, for M+R International, Brussels, funded by World Bank: 'tax problems of rural municipalities'

-China, 1990, for the UN Centre for Transnational Corporations : workshop at . Zuhai on 'control of transfer pricing manipulations'

-Editor of book of readings on ‘'Transfer Pricing and International Taxation', vol.14 in 20-volume UN Library on Transnational Corporations, published by Routledge for the UN Centre for Transnational Corporations, 1994

-Bulgaria, 1993, for KPMG Washington, funded by the World Bank: 'privatisation at municipal levels of government'

-Chapters on Belgium and the Netherlands for a study on ‘ interregional shifts in industrial activities', 1993-94, for LCA Europe, Paris and CEDRE, Strasbourg, funded by the EEC Commission

-Paraguay, March 1994, for the ‘ Foreign Investment Advisory Service 'of IFC, Washington: 'evaluation of tax incentive legislation'.

-Namibia, July 1994, for ‘ Société d’Etudes et de Conseil ‘, Louvain-la- Neuve and University of Warwick: ‘ budget procedures ‘, within a 'Public Expenditure Review', funded by the World Bank

-Tanzania, July 1995, progress report on implementation of World Bank loan to improve the legal system in Tanzania

-Member of a panel of independent experts, on 'company taxation', by the DG XXII of the EU -Commission, June 1999- February 2001

-Belgian Member for a study by the Transeuropean Policy Studies Association (TEPSA) on (open) methods of self-coordination (in the EU)’, 2002-04

-Research, in Shanghai and Beijing on ‘ The tax treatment of foreign-funded enterprises in China;

-Present Problems and Outlook “, September –November 1999, for the China-Europe Management Center, Antwerp

-Coordinator, and main author, of Report to the European Parliament about Own resources: Evolution of the system in the EU-25', for the Study Group of European Policies, Brussels, 2005

-Co-author and directing a group of young scholars at the European Institute of Asian Studies, in Brussels on 'Towards a bilateral investment agreement between Taiwan and the EU ?’, summer 2014

== Bibliography ==
- Sylvain Plasschaert, The EU Consolidated Income Tax Revisited, CESifo Working Paper Series No. 670, February 2002
- Relocating Productive Capacity to China? Or Elsewhere?

1. "België in alle staten. Vlaanderen en Wallonië in een Brusselse Knoop ? ”( 'Belgium in all its states. Flanders and Wallonia in a Brussels Knot"?), Garant, 2009, 150 p.

1.bis (in French translation, by the author and his spouse) “ La Belgique dans tous ses états. La Flandre, la Wallonie dans un nœud bruxellois? « Le Cri, April 2010, 182 p.. .

2. "China: Inzicht in zijn Doorbraak ('China : Insight in its Surge'), Leuven : Davidsfonds, 2007, 295 p.

3. Wie is bang van China? Geschiedenis, Economie, Toekomst “(‘ Who is afraid of China? History, Economy, Prospects ‘) Leuven: Davidsfonds, 2001, 220 p.

4. "The micro-economic impact of the enlargement of the European Union “( chapters in Dutch or French), ( coordinator) in 'Studia Diplomatica', special issue, 2003, 178 p.

5. "Transfer Pricing and International Taxation" (editor), vol.14 of the United Nations Library on Transnational Corporations, London: Routledge, 1994, 330 p.; survey-introduction also in "Transnational Corporations and World Development", London: International Thomson Business Press, 1996, p. 394-417

6. "Multinational and national Economic Policies, with particular Reference to Latin America" (editor), Rome-Freiburg: Herder Verlag, 1989, 245 p.

7. "Schedular, Global and Dualistic Systems of Income Taxation", Amsterdam, Bureau for International Fiscal Documentation, 1988, 188 p., translated into Chinese

8. "Transfer Pricing and Multinational Enterprises. An Overview of Concepts, Mechanisms and Regulations", Westlead: Saxon House and ECSIM, 1979, 120 p.; translated into French and (expanded version) into Italian

9. "Financiële Aspecten van de Regionalisatie. Oriëntaties voor een rationeel systeem van middelenvoorziening van de Gewesten in België" ('financial aspects of the regionalisation in Belgium'.) Published by the 'Gewestelijke Economische Raad voor Vlaanderen', 1973, 90 p.., translated into French. Was awarded the 1976 Prize for 'Public Law and Local Economies' of the 'Crédit Communal-Gemeentekrediet'.

10. "Cedulaire, globale en gemengde types van inkomstenbelastingen", ('Schedular, global and mixed Types of Income Taxation'), Leuven: Uystpruyst, 1964, XVII+294 p. (= doctoral thesis). Was awarded the 'Vliebergh Prize for Economics", 1966

11. "Het Financiewezen in België" ('The financial System in Belgium'), co-author M. Dombrecht, Antwerp: MIM -first edition : 1989, XIX + 473 p. -second edition : 1992, 477 p. -third edition, : 1996, 490 p. -fourth edition : March 2001 (co-authors: M. Dombrecht, D.Heremans, J. Vanneste), Antwerp : Standaard Uitgeverij, 586 p.-fifth edition, 2006, 573 p.

== Sources ==
- Sylvain Plasschaert (Govecor)
