= IOB =

IOB may stand for:

- Indian Overseas Bank, a public sector bank in India
- Input/Output Block, see Execute Channel Program
- Inside Outside Beginning, a file representation format for tagging tokens
- Institute of Development Policy and Management, Instituut voor Ontwikkelingsbeleid en -beheer (University of Antwerp, Belgium)
- Intelligence Oversight Board, of the U.S. President's Foreign Intelligence Advisory Board
- Iranian oil bourse, a commodity exchange
