= B+ =

B+ may refer to:

- B+, a blood type
- B+ (grade), an academic grade
- B+ (photographer), an Irish photographer and filmmaker based in Los Angeles, California
- B+ tree, a data structure
- B+, a British home computer BBC Micro model
- B+, a British single-board computer Raspberry Pi model
- B+, the plus voltage of a Battery (electricity) or plus voltage of an electronic circuit
- B Plus, a Belgian non-profit organization
- B augmented triad, a chord made up of the notes B, D#, and F𝄪.
