= Poelaert Foundation =

Support for the Brussels Palace of Justice

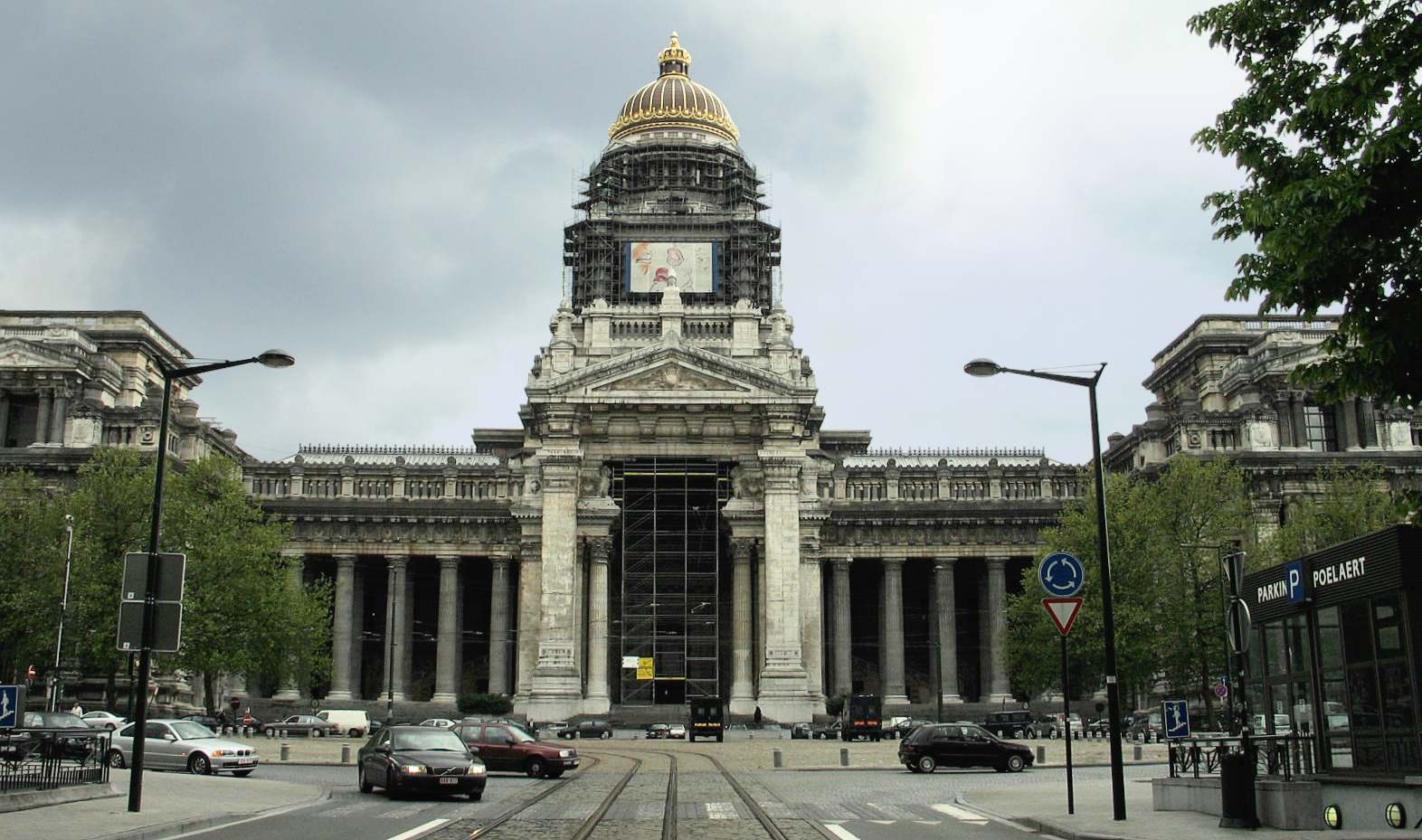
Palace of Justice on the Place Poelaert/Poelaertplein

The Poelaert Foundation is a Belgian association of public interest, incorporated by the Bar Association of Brussels. The Foundation bears the name of the architect Joseph Poelaert.

== Objectives ==
The Poelaert Foundation aims to ensure respect for the Brussels Palace of Justice. The group aims to concentrate all major judicial functions in Brussels, upon and around the Place Poelaert/Poelaertplein. This will allow all persons seeking justice or working within the judicial system to find all aspects of that system in one central place. The Foundation proposed a modern infrastructure for Justice on the Poelaert Campus. This includes a functional renovation of the Palace of Justice and the transfer of all judicial services, currently located elsewhere in Brussels, to the Poelaert Campus.

== History ==
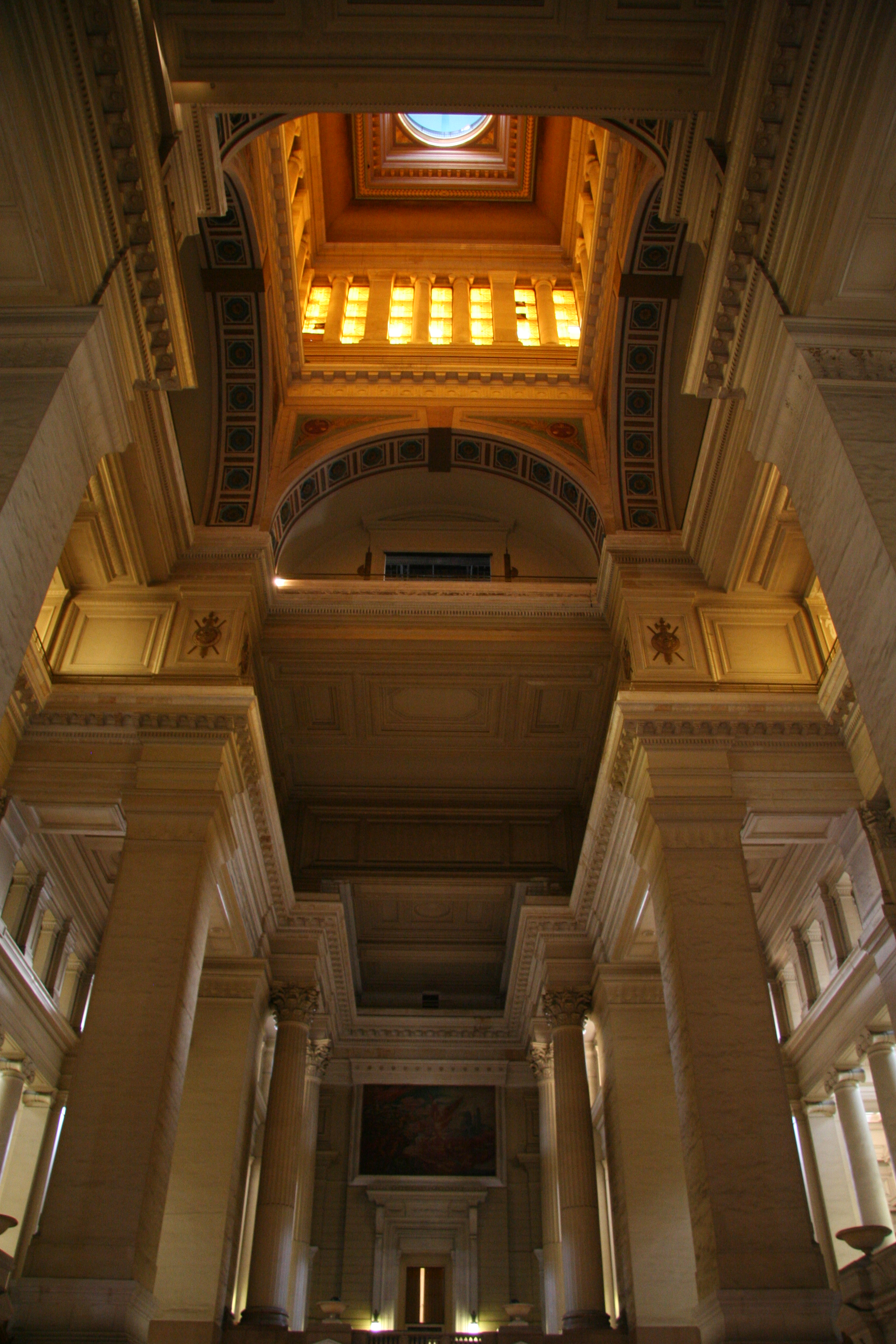
The great hall of the Palace of Justice

The Foundation came as a reaction to a Minister of Justice who was thinking of moving the courts from the Palace of Justice altogether and to a Secretary of State, who proposed to reserve 45,000 m^{2} (480,000 sq ft) in the building for commercial, recreational and cultural purposes.

The Foundation was created on 26 September 2011 (14 years ago) by the Dutch and the French speaking Bar Associations of Brussels. The board of directors is composed of representatives of these associations, of magistrates and of other personalities from Brussels.

The first Board of Directors included Jean-Pierre De Bandt, Jos Chabert, Michel Didisheim, Diane Hennebert, Ernest Krings, Christine Matray, François Schuiten, Hugo Weckx and presidents of the Bar Council Jean-Pierre Buyle and Dirk Van Gerven.

In 2012, the Foundation composed the principles that should govern a master plan for the Campus Poelaert. It was prepared by architect Jos Vandenbreeden, in collaboration with lawyer Jean-Pierre De Bandt and architect Francis Metzger. The document was handed over to the government, represented by Justice Minister Annemie Turtelboom and Secretary of State Servais Verherstraeten.

In 2013 the Foundation published a proposal for an integrated management structure for Campus Poelaert, with incorporation of all courthouses to be entrusted to a public company with a professional board of directors. This company should, together with private partners, plan for the renovation of the Palace of Justice, in accordance with the policy principles put forward in 2012. This document was delivered to the Government.
