= Vangheluwe =

Vangheluwe is a Flemish surname that may refer to the following notable people:

- Hans Vangheluwe, Belgian researcher in computer simulation and modelling
- Jody Vangheluwe (born 1997), Belgian football defender
- Roger Vangheluwe (1936–2026), Belgian Roman Catholic bishop
- Warre Vangheluwe (born 2001), Belgian cyclist
