= Coudenberg group =

Belgian federalist think tank

The Coudenberg group (Dutch: Coudenberggroep, French: Groupe Coudenberg) was a Belgian federalist think-tank, it was named after the place where the members met, the Coudenberg, one of the seven hillocks on which the centre of Brussels has been built. President of the organization was the lawyer Jean-Pierre De Bandt.

== Organisation ==
The Coudenberg group was established on 6 June 1984 as a non-profit organization and was dissolved on 11 February 1999. The think-tank united leading people from the university, administration, ventures, trade unions and the free professions. The Coudenberg group presented itself as an independent think-tank which unites, on the basis of a linguistic and ideological pluralism, people who understand that Belgium is itself on a cross point and who want to contribute to the political renewal of this country. The Coudenberg group thought about issues concerning the organization of federal Belgium and published several studies about this topic. Its goal was to defend the federal state against the demands of Flemish nationalists.

== Members ==
Among the approximately 70 members were people such as Antoine Bekaert, André Belmans, Philippe Bodson, Bart De Schutter, Jacques De Staercke, Hubert Detremmerie, Mark Dubrulle, Jan Huyghebaert, Koen Lenaerts, Jacques Moulaert, Sylvain Plasschaert, Carlos Van Rafelghem, Paul Van Remoortere, Els Witte, Kris Deschouwer, Mieke Offeciers-Vandewiele, Patrick van Ypersele de Strihou (family of Jacques van Ypersele de Strihou). The most active members were Frans Vanistendael (former professor fiscal law at the Catholic University of Leuven), Bavo Cool, Alain Deneef (later president of the NMBS), Roland Charlier (civil servant ), Charles van der Straeten Waillet, Jacques Groothaert, Michel van den Abeele, Guy Schrans, Felix Standaert and Jan Hinnekens. Vincent Van Quickenborne was a junior member.

== Bibliography ==
- Naar een nieuw België, Lannoo, Tielt (1987)
- In naam van de democratie, Roularta Media Group, Roeselare, (1991)
- De buitenlandse betrekkingen in het federale België
- Federal type solutions and European integration, University Press of America (1990)

== See also ==
- B Plus
- Itinera Institute
