= Jean-Pierre De Bandt =

Belgian lawyer

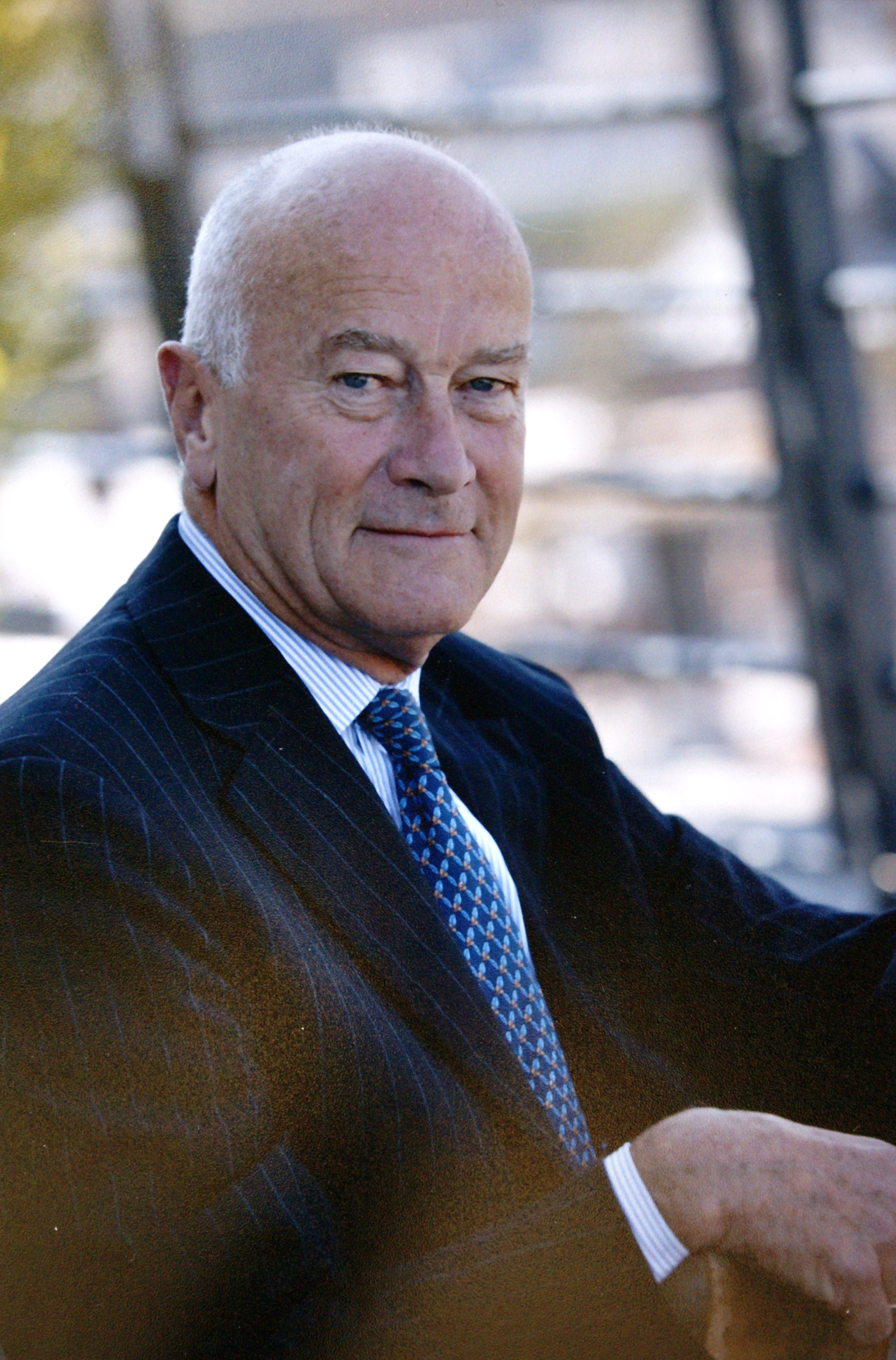
Jean-Pierre De Bandt

Jean-Pierre, Baron de Bandt (born Antwerp, 23 January 1934) is a Belgian lawyer and former President of the Coudenberg group, a Belgian federalist think tank.

== Education ==
From 1951 until 1953, he studied at the Facultés universitaires Notre-Dame de la Paix (FUNDP) after which he graduated as:

- doctor of law at the Catholic University of Leuven in 1956;
- master in economics at the same university in 1959;
- Master of Law at Harvard Law School in 1960;
- master in political and social sciences at the University of Leuven in 1961;

== Career ==
He started his career in 1961 as a member of the Antwerp Bar (1956) then joined the American law firm Frank Boas Law Office in 1961 in Brussels, to become a partner in 1966.

He was also a lecturer at the Hoger Instituut voor Bestuurswetenschappen (University of Antwerp) (1962 - 1972).

He started his own law firm "De Bandt Dilley" on 1 July 1969 with Charles Dilley and two collaborators. Ivo Van Bael and Walter Van Gerven became partners. On 1 January Jean-Pierre Lagae also became a named partner, making the law firm's name "De Bandt, Lagae & Van Bael". Through a merger with the law firm of Georges van Hecke, which included a.o. Jean-Marie Nelissen-Grade, the firm grew and the name changed to "De Bandt, van Hecke, Lagae & Van Bael". Around 1992 Ivo Van Bael and Jean François Bellis left the partnership, thus reducing the name of the law firm.

For 20 years he was Chairman and Managing Partner of what became "De Bandt, van Hecke & Lagae". It was the first law firm in Belgium organized along the structure and lines of law partnerships in the United States and Great-Britain (partnership, full integration of revenues, clients are linked to the partnership not to a single partner, special status of associates moving to partnership, etc.). It was also one of the first to have lawyers that were not accredited in Belgium (in particular Japanese) joining and to have the day-to-day management of the office run by someone who was not an attorney.

The firm collaborated with other firms abroad. Starting on 1 January 1990 this was formalised in "The Alliance of European Lawyers" as a European Economic Interest Grouping, with a.o. an integrated office in Brussels ("Brussels Combined Office").

The firm merged in 1999 with the Luxemburg firm Loesch & Wolter to become De Bandt, van Hecke, Lagae & Loesch.

Since 1996 "The Alliance of European Lawyers" was looking to fit into the evolving market of internationally active law firms. On 22 July 1998 a Memorandum of Understanding was signed between 4 members of "The Alliance of European Lawyers" (incl. "De Bandt, van Hecke & Lagae") and the London city firm "Linklaters & Paines". After an expedited integration, and one Alliance Partner (De Brauw in the Netherlands) and some partners of De Bandt, van Hecke, Lagae leaving, on 1 January 2001 "De Bandt, van Hecke, Lagae & Loesch" merged into "Linklaters De Bandt". De Bandt became senior counsel of the merged firm, Jean-Pierre Blumberg its managing partner.

At the time of the merger with Linklaters, De Bandt, van Hecke & Lagae was the largest firm of solicitors ("avocats-advocaten") in Belgium, with more than 200 full-time lawyers.

After having reached the age cap (for partners of Linklaters) he left the partnership and practices law as an independent lawyer.

Pierre de Bandt focuses on Belgian and European regulatory law (e.g. competition, free movement and regulated sectors) and Belgian commercial law. He is a member of the bar of Brussels.

== Other activities ==
De Bandt was director of several commercial companies and was chairman of the Board of Wang Europe SA, Robert Bosch Belgium SA, Océ interservices SA, Telenorma SA, Guylian NV, Alcopa NV.

== Cultural and civic activities ==
- Chairman of the Philharmonic Society of Brussels (1991-2002);
- Chairman of the Mont des Arts — Kunstberg society (1999-2007);
- Chairman and member of the management committee of the Music chapel Queen Elisabeth (2002-2007);
- Chairman of the Contius Foundation, which is in the process of building an organ in the St Michael church in Leuven. It aims at copying the last organ left by the organ-builder Heinrich Andreas Contius in Lipaya (Latvia). Contius was the preferred organ-builder of Johann Sebastian Bach;
- Chairman of the Museum Prize;

He was the founder and chairman of a large civic society "The Coudenberg Group" and the "Interuniversity Center for the study of Federalism" (1984-1998), both centered on the institutional future of Belgium.

He was chairman of two foundations at the University of Namur:

- Ceruna (Centre d'étude et de recherche universitaire de Namur);
- Institut Moretus Plantin (1990-2009).

Further he was:

- chairman of the Harvard Club of Belgium;
- director and general secretary of the American Chamber of Commerce in Belgium (1975-1985);

He is a director of the Poelaert Foundation which aims at promoting a full renovation of the Palace of Justice in Brussels, called Poelaert by the name of its architect, which at the time of its inauguration (1886) was considered as the largest building in the world and is one of the architectural masterpieces of the late 19th century.

== Various ==
- De Bandt was knighted (chevalier-ridder) and granted hereditary nobility by King Baudouin on 16 July 1993. He was awarded the title of baron by King Albert II on 15 June 2009.
- He was military champion of Belgium of 100 m butterfly in 1959.
- He was legal arbitrator, acting for the Olympic Committee, at the Beijing games of 2008.

== Bibliography ==
In addition to many legal articles on business law and constitutional law, he published a series of books:

- Business Guide to Belgium, Common market Report, Commerce Clearing House, Chicago, 1967.
- Quelle Belgique pour demain, Ed. Duculot,1987.
- Naar een nieuw Belgïe, Lannoo, 1987.
- The Belgian Constitution and Constitutional development. An introduction to an exhaustive bibliography, Center for the study of federalism, Temple University, Philadelphia, USA, 1987.
- The new Belgian institutional framework, Center for the study of federalism, Brussels, 1989.
- Kopen en verkopen van een onderneming. Juridische aspecten, Cegos, 1990.
- L'achat et la vente d'une entreprise, implications juridiques, Cegos, 1990.
- In naam van de democratie, (in collaboration), Roularta Books, 1990.
- Federalisme et territorialité - Réflexions en marge de la troisième phase de la réforme de l'état, Centre d'étude du Fédéralisme, Brussels, 1991.
- Federalisme en territorialiteit, Studiecentrum voor Federalisme, Brussels, 1991.
- Au nom de la démocratie, (in collaboration), Roularta books.
- International Corporate Procedures, Jordans, 1992.
- Democracy and the rule of law; The Primacy of Community law; The Belgian federalisation process, in Belgium and EC membership evaluated, Ed. by M.A.G. van Meerhaeghe, Pinter Publishers, London, St. Martin's Press, New York, 1992.
- Cost of non-Belgium. De meerwaarde van het federaal Belgïe (in collaboration), Roularta books, 1996.
- Cost of non-Belgium. La valeur ajoutée de la Belgique Fédérale, (in collaboration), Roularta Books, 1996.

== Literature ==
- Board of Management of the Queen Elisabeth Music Foundation
- Rik Decan, Wie is Wie in Vlaanderen, 2000.
- Oscar Coomans de Brachène, État présent de la noblesse belge, Annuaire 2003, Brussel, 2003.
- Humbert Marnix de Sainte Aldegonde, État présent de la noblesse belge, Annuaire 2015, Faveurs nobiliaires accordées par Sa Majesté le Roi Albert II, Brussels, 2015.
