= Detremmerie =

Detremmerie is a surname. Notable people with the surname include:

- Hubert Detremmerie (1930–2008), Belgian businessman and banker
- Jean-Pierre Detremmerie (1940–2016), Belgian politician and mayor of Mouscron
