= Christine Van Broeckhoven =

Molecular biologist, professor

- Born: 9 April 1953 (age 73)
- Occupations: politician, biologist, professor
- Awards: Potamkin Prize (1993)

Christine Van Broeckhoven (born 9 April 1953) is a Belgian molecular biologist and professor in Molecular genetics at the University of Antwerp (Antwerp, Belgium). She is also leading the VIB Department of Molecular Genetics, University of Antwerp of the Flanders Institute for Biotechnology (VIB). Christine Van Broeckhoven does research on Alzheimer dementia, bipolar mental disorders and other neurological diseases. Since 1983 she has had her own laboratory for molecular genetics at the University of Antwerp, and since 2005 is focussing her research on neurodegenerative brain diseases. She is an associate editor of the scientific journal Genes, Brain and Behavior.

== Honors ==
For her achievements as a scientist, Van Broeckhoven received the Belgian Quinquennial Prize of the Belgian National Science Foundation and in 1993 she and three other scientists were awarded the American Potamkin Prize for their work on the amyloid precursor protein (APP) which can cause severe, early Alzheimer's disease. In 2005, she was awarded the Arkprijs van het Vrije Woord. In 2006, she was awarded as laureate for Europe the international L'Oréal-UNESCO Award for Women in Science of l'Oréal and UNESCO, "For the genetic investigation of Alzheimer's disease and other neurodegenerative diseases". She was the winner of the European Inventor Award 2011, category research., and she received the Metlife Foundation Award for Medical Research in Alzheimer's Disease in 2012.

== Involvement in politics ==
On 19 March 2007 it became known that Christine Van Broeckhoven would be a candidate for the Socialist Party – Differently, a center-left social-democratic party, in the 2007 Belgian federal elections. Van Broeckhoven headed the list for the Belgian Chamber of People's Representatives in the province of Antwerp. On 10 June 2007 she was elected a member of the Chamber of People's Representatives. She retired from politics after the 2010 Belgian general election to concentrate on her scientific work.

== See also ==
- Jurgen Del-Favero
- Vincent Timmerman
