= Marcel van Meerhaeghe =

Belgian economist and university teacher (1921–2014)

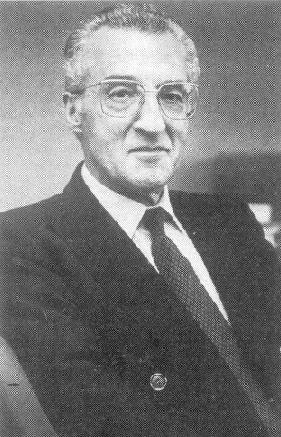
- Born: 12 April 1921; Wetteren, Belgium
- Died: 22 March 2014 (aged 92); Ghent, Belgium
- Education: Royal Military Academy, University of Ghent
- Spouse: Cecile-Maria Buysse (m. 1939–1998)
- Children: 1
- Scientific career
- Fields: Economics, International economics, Monetary economics, Political economics, European economy, Behavioral economics
- Workplaces: Colonial University of Belgium, NATO Defence College, University of Ghent, Official University of Belgian Kongo and Ruanda-Urundi, Wolfson College, Tilburg University, London School of Economics, University of Turin, Sapienza University of Rome
- Thesis: Aviation in the traffic economy: the Belgian case in particular (1946)
- Doctoral advisor: Professor dr. André de Ridder
- Doctoral students: Marc De Clercq
- Other notable students: Luc Versele, Freddy Willockx, Frank Smets, Luc Coene, Jan Smets

Marcel Alfons Gilbert van Meerhaeghe (12 April 1921 – 22 March 2014) was a Belgian economist, professor, publicist and columnist.

Marcel van Meerhaeghe was Professor of International Economic Relations at the State University of Ghent.

== Life and career ==
=== 1939–1987 ===
Initially Marcel van Meerhaeghe thought about a military career. In 1939 he passed the entrance exams for the Royal Military Academy (ERM). After the campaign of 1940 followed about seven months as a prisoner of war in a German camp (an intervention of King Leopold III resulted in the release of the ERM-students).

At Ghent University (Belgium) van Meerhaeghe obtained a master's degree in Economic Sciences in 1944 (first diet: July) and a Masters in Political Science and Sociology, also in 1944 (second diet: September). As regards the economics studies he attended the lectures given by Professor Raoul Miry who was the counterpart of Professor Gaston Eyskens of the university of Leuven.

In 1946 he obtained his PhD: Aviation in the traffic economy : the Belgian case in particular.

In 1947 he became part-time lecturer political economy at the Colonial University of Belgium (Antwerp) and in 1955 part-time lecturer colonial economy at the University of Ghent.

Before becoming Professor of economics and international economics at the University of Ghent in 1957, he worked as economic advisor in the Belgian Ministry of Economic Affairs, as 'faculty advisor' of the NATO Defence College in Paris (1953–54) and as an advisor to the Minister of Foreign Trade.

His interest covered all types of international academic cooperation and face-to-face interaction, which is why in September 1959 he was appointed visiting professor at the Official University of Belgian Kongo and Ruanda-Urundi in Elisabethville for the courses Histoire des doctrines sociales et économiques and Histoire des doctrines économiques. He obtained a visiting professorship at the universities of Amsterdam in 1962 and Constantine (Algeria) in 1975, as well as becoming a visiting fellow at Wolfson College, Cambridge in 1973.

Between 1961 and 1969 he was Vice-President and (since 1964) President of the Prices Commission, an advisory body to the Minister for Economic Affairs (replaced in 1969 by the Commission pour la régulation des prix: Royal Decree 3 June 1969).

Between 1962 and 1969 he was co-opted as a member of the Conseil Central de l'Économie, the umbrella institution of the Belgian federal social and economic dialogue.

Since 1971 he was also a member of the board of the Belgian-Luxemburg Exchange Control (Institut Belgo-Luxembourgeois du Change), chaired by the Governor of the Belgian National Bank, until November 2002 when this institution was dissolved (Euro).

Between 1972 and 1980 he was a member of the conseil général of the Caisse générale d'épargne et de retraite.

At its editors' request, van Meerhaeghe started a column in the Flemish business magazine Trends in 1975. He also featured as a regular columnist in the newspaper The Standaard between 1988 and 1996.

Luc Versele, since 2017 chairman of the Belgian bank Crelan, was an assistant of Professor van Meerhaeghe at Ghent University.

M. van Meerhaeghe was always steadfast in taking a strictly independent line of argument. By all means he was an individualist – one might say a 'loner' – concurring with the suggestion of A. Einstein that the ideal occupation for the theoretical scientist is that of a lighthouse keeper. Unfortunately, sometimes he was misunderstood by persons driven by ignorance, superficiality and envy towards the well-heeled. An example of a rule of best practice that leads to controversy when publicly stated: «A firm that puts the ethical considerations of other stakeholders such as employees first and business second could undermine the overall welfare of the firm and its shareholders/owners and even its employees» (van Meerhaeghe quoted by Professor Tom Turner and Dr. Lorraine Ryan).

A significant part of van Meerhaeghe's work belongs to what is commonly labelled as the American theory of public choice. He advocated great concern for a sound use of government means (struggle against profligacy) and was favourable towards Taxpayers Associations (USA, Sweden, Federal Republic of Germany) that facilitate the contacts between the authorities and the public opinion.

=== Emeritus ===
After his Belgian retirement on 1 October 1986 van Meerhaeghe was successively visiting professor in international economics and European integration at the Centre of International Studies of the Tilburg University (1987), at the London School of Economics, London University (academic year 1987–88 – the Belgian Chair), at the University of Turin (1989–92: Professor Count di Robilant of the Faculty of Law; 1997–98: Faculty of Economics) and during the academic years 1993–95 at the university of Rome (La Sapienza).

In 1987–1988 he was 'Special Adviser to the Commission of the European Communities', more particularly to Mr Willy De Clercq, former Belgian Vice Prime Minister and a member of the Commission (1985–1989: Commissioner for External Relations, responsible for international relations and foreign trade).

M. van Meerhaeghe was member of the academic advisory council of the Brussels think-tank Institut Européen (Institutum Europaeum : 1979–2002) and the conservative think-tank Centre for the New Europe (1993–2009). At the last one he published The Information Policy of the European Commission (Vol. 4, Zellik April 1995). Since 1988 he was a Life Member of the Mont Pèlerin Society.

Between 1986 and 2009 he chaired the Board of Directors of Centrale Kredietverlening (CKV), a small savings bank.

M. van Meerhaeghe was one of the 165 German-speaking Professors of Economics who signed the Declaration « The Euro starts too early » (date: February 1998).

== Legacy ==
M. van Meerhaeghe is the author of 22 books (editor of 4 collective works) and about 160 articles.

=== Theory must reflect reality ===
Already early in his career (in an article of 1947) he took a position: he opposed the numerous publications that have no relation whatsoever with reality («struggle for life») and especially deplored the mania for addressing everything with mathematics. He was in favor of operational economics, helpful to practitioners (nützlich). Later he elaborated his criticism in Economic Theory. A Critic's Companion (Martinus Nijhoff 1980), probably his most important work. It caused quite a stir because of its unconventional approach. (K. Nakaura published a Japanese translation.) Guy Routh wrote a favourable review in The Economic Journal (Vol. 91, No. 362, June 1981, p. 591): "Professor van Meerhaeghe's book is a masterpiece of condensation: a review of economic theory from Plato to Friedman, with the faults exposed, in 109 pages of text. Six chapters deal with the main divisions of the subject (consumer behaviour, producer behaviour, price, income distribution, general level of income and prices, growth, and international trade), one with its practicability, one with its significance, and an appendix added that surveys thirteen types of theory. The preface modestly disclaims any intention of instructing fellow economists. The book is intended as a complement to an introductory course in economics. It is reminiscent of a surveyors report of a tumble-down house. It is unfit for human habitation, one would be mad to buy it, but one does, patches it up together as best one can, and inhabits it contentedly, gradually becoming inured to its defects. It is chastening to learn, from van Meerhaeghe's review, how deftly and how long ago the weaknesses of the economic edifice have been revealed. Mayer (1932), Miry (1937), Triffin (1940) and many others produced cogent criticisms that, had they been heeded, would have helped to convert economics into an operational science. Instead, their names and doctrines have been forgotten, and we may be grateful to van Meerhaeghe for reminding us of them." G. Routh's conclusion is brief and to the point : "This guarantees van Meerhaeghe's slim volume a long life. I fear that in ten years time its criticisms will be as valid and as relevant as they are today". He proved to be something of an optimist: they remain as valid today as they did in 1981.

=== Books ===
As the most significant pieces of work we mention:

- Theorie van de Economische Politiek (Stenfert Kroese, Leiden 1962), a sound textbook on economic policy featuring contributions from Dutch and Belgian experts: among others J.E. Andriessen (ed.), J. Tinbergen, Pieter Hennipman, A. Devreker, C.J. Oort, P. de Wolff and H.W. Lambers. The contribution of M. van Meerhaeghe (ed.) was the chapter on international economic policy. Professor P. Hennipman, arguably the finest Dutch economic theorist ever, dedicated his Welvaartstheorie en economische politiek (Samsom, Alphen a/d Rijn 1977) to M. van Meerhaeghe (p. 5).
- Marktvormen, marktgedrag en Marktresultaten in België (Story, Ghent 1963) : market structure, behaviour and performance.
- International Economic Institutions (Longmans, Kluwer Academic Publishers, Dordrecht, 7 editions between 1966 and 1998). A review about the fourth edition: «...those readers who are looking for factual information in the field of international European and other regional organizations now have at their disposal a new and very useful survey of this world of abbreviations and what is behind it.» In the conclusion of the last edition van Meerhaeghe deals with such subjects as the need for rationalisation and escape clauses. 7th edition: Kluwer Academic Publishers ISBN 0-7923-8072-X; Springer ISBN 978-0-7923-8072-6.
- Economics: Britain and the EEC (Longmans, London 1969): the papers contained in this study (by a.o. Harry Johnson, John Pinder and Prof. Dennis Swann), first presented at a symposium on British economic policy and the E.E.C. held at the University of Ghent in February 1969, consider the main economic issues raised by Britain's application to join the European Economic Community. A very useful little volume according to the review in The Economic Journal.
- Price Theory and Price Policy (Longmans, London 1969): a selection of articles taking into account the experience of M. van Meerhaeghe as president of the Prices Commission. The six articles contained in this volume provide a broad outline of problems relating to price theory and price policy. The books main features are a critical survey of the neo-classical price theory and a discussion of the proper public instruments of price policy.
- Economics, A critical approach (Weidenfeld & Nicolson, London 1971).
- International Economics (Longman Group Limited/Prentice Hall Press, London, Crane Russak, New York 1972). A very useful introductory text. Throughout, its orientation is strongly towards applied economic problems, but its theoretical sections are closely argued and very well keyed into the literature. Thus it should prove a useful introduction for most students, while leading those more interested in the subject quickly on to the more specialist literature. Particularly the chapter The operation of the international monetary system (pp. 216–237).
- The Envy Society (De afgunstmaatschappij): bundle of a number of columns on economic and social affairs (Stenfert Kroese, Leiden 1977).
- Economic Theory. A Critic's Companion (H.E. Stenfert Kroese, Antwerp/Martinus Nijhoff, Boston, Lancaster 1980, 2nd ed. 1986). 2nd edition: Springer ISBN 978-9-4017-1367-2.
- Museum of grootmacht. De identiteitscrisis van Europa (Lannoo, Tielt 1985). A reflection of the lectures during which he suggested students to read A.I. Solzhenitsyn.
- Belgium and EC Membership Evaluated (Pinter Publishers, London, St. Martin's Press, New York 1992) : contributions by 14 authors, a.o. Filip Abraham, Roger Blanpain, Marc Quintyn, Alfred Cahen, Philippe de Schoutheete, Jean-Pierre De Bandt and Jef Vuchelen (cf. note 21).

=== Lectures ===
==== 1959–2002 ====
Teaching international economics results in delivering lectures at a variety of universities and international conferences: Warsaw (1961), Geneva (Conference on science and technology in promoting the development of developing countries), Pretoria (1964; Cultural Treaty between South-Africa, the Netherlands and Belgium), Bratislava, Hull, Prague (1969 and 1989), Iasi (1971), Alvor, Vienna (U.N.I.D.O.), Berlin, Uppsala, New York, Cracow (1977), Sofia, Naples, Florence, Moscow (1992), Jena, Orel, Valencia, Haigerloch, Göteborg, Porto, Lisbon, Venice (2001), etc. Some lectures were later published as an essay in their own right, e.g.:

- Die Entwicklung der Wirtschaft im Kongo. Folgerungen für die Theorie des Wirtschaftswachstums (Nürnberger Vorträge – Gegenwartsfragen aus Wirtschaft und Gesellschaft, Band 2; Kohlhammer, Stuttgart 1965).
- Aktuelle Probleme der belgischen Wirtschaftspolitik (Kieler Vorträge, Heft 43, Institut für Weltwirtschaft an der Universität, Kiel 1966).
- Il Mediterraneo e la Comunità Europea, Parallelo 38, Università per Stranieri "Dante Alighieri" Reggio Calabria, supplemento al n. 10, ottobre 1991, pp. 1–14.
- The 'revolution' in the Belgian banking environment, Repères - Bulletin Économique et Financier, II/1995, pp. 15–19. Lecture given at the annual meeting of the Società Italiana di Economia, Demografia e Statistica (Capri, 3 May 1994). Inter alia about the premature EMU.
- Regional Policy of the European Communities, in Institutional aspects of regionalism in a Pan-European context, Second Belgian-Russian Scientific Seminar, 1–9 July 1996 Yekaterinburg, ed. by Prof. Katlijn Malfliet and Veniamin V. Alekseev, pp. 32–36.

==== Heilbronn Symposium ====
In order to understand economic problems, at all times the contemporary political, social, psychological and cultural factors have to be taken into account (the role of context: are the assumptions vindicated or wrongheaded ?). Relentlessly van Meerhaeghe insisted upon the necessity of knowledge of the historic backgrounds. Indeed, as history was his favoured subject area, since 1999 he was very active for the Annual Heilbronn Symposium in Economics and the Social Sciences because it goes back to the old masters, i.e. the German classicists of the 19th (and even 18th) century. The German universities attracted many foreign students with a knowledge of German. Nowadays, some of these 'scholars' tend to invent theories which had already been formulated in Germany during the 19th century. Hence the observation, made in Economic Theory (see above) that «far too often in economics, conclusions that were already formulated long ago are drawn triumphantly» (p. 4). We mention :

- The lost chapter of Schumpeter’s ‘Economic Development’ in Joseph Aloïs Schumpeter. Entrepreneurship, style and vision, ed. J. Backhaus, The European Heritage in Economics and the Social Sciences, Vol. 1, Kluwer, Boston, Dordrecht, London 2003, pp. 233–244. M. van Meerhaeghe considers Schumpeter as ‘superior’ to Keynes because of his better knowledge of the economic science and his unsurpassed ‘History of economic analysis’. (The essay by van Meerhaeghe forms the center of the book.)
- Nietzsche and economics and Nietzsche and business ethics, in Friedrich Nietzsche 1844–1900. Economy and Society, ed. J. Backhaus and W. Drechsler, The European Heritage in Economics and the Social Sciences, Vol. 3, Kluwer 2003 (later Springer, New York, Heidelberg 2006), pp. 39–54 and 139–144. Contrary to certain scholars van Meerhaeghe doesn't regard Nietzsche's views on economics as particularly sensational, even though there are certain aspects of his philosophy which could provide a better tool for economic analysis in some fields.
- Bismarck and the social question, Journal of Economic Studies, Sept. 2006, Vol. 33, Iss. 4, pp. 284–301. Discussing the political consequences of social welfare legislation, and in particular its effects on the Social Question. Otto von Bismarck (at some time ambassador for Prussia in Saint-Petersburg) did not expect that the Social Question could be solved within a generation or two (p. 285). Although von Bismarck's position passed through many important alterations, one aim remains unchanged: guarantee the stability and social peace of the state.
- The international aspects of Justi’s work, in The beginnings of Political Economy. Johann Heinrich Gottlob von Justi, ed. J. Backhaus, The European Heritage in Economics and the Social Sciences, Vol. 7, Springer, New York 2009, pp. 99–110. Justi might have been expected to adopt a protectionist and nationalist stance, but instead he comes across as an 'anti-Machiavelli' in his foreign-policy nostrums and a liberal in his views on foreign trade and population policy.
- Is Montaigne a Utopian ?, in The State as Utopia – Continental Approaches, ed J. Backhaus, The European Heritage in Economics and the Social Sciences, Vol. 9, Springer, 2011, pp. 67–76. Van Meerhaeghe refutes the idea that Montaigne would have been a 'famous utopian': no, he was the founder of modern scepticism.
- Mature Cameralism According to Pfeiffer, in Physiocracy, Antiphysiocracy and Pfeiffer, ed J. Backhaus, The European Heritage in Economics and the Social Sciences, Vol. 10, Springer, 2011, pp. 135–147. Unfortunately there is a good deal of terminological confusion on display. Cameralism is the German version of mercantilism; trade requires freedom. Adam Smith's criticism of mercantilism is wrong.
- The Austrian and German "Economist" in the interwar period: international aspects, in The beginnings of Scholarly Economic Journalism, ed. J. Backhaus, The European Heritage in Economics and the Social Sciences, Vol. 12, Springer, 2011, pp. 65–71. Keynes' The economic consequences of the peace and the allies' post-war policy explain why every German wanted to undo Versailles.
- Globalisation: concept, outcome, future – a continental view, European Journal of Law and Economics, April 2012, Vol. 33, Iss. 2 (Essays in honour of Dr. Reginald Hansen, 1919–2016), pp. 239–306. Van Meerhaeghe examines the dominant political, social and economic trends of our time: multiculturalism and immigration versus patriotism and regionalism, capitalism versus state governance, America versus the rest of the world. He concludes a.o. that (a) Russia is a normal trade partner and a natural ally for Europe, and (b) nothing seems to stop the further triumphal procession of – undemocratic – globalisation.

=== Selected articles ===
Van Meerhaeghe was also a prolific author of acticles. A selection:

- The International Monetary Fund Twenty Years On, Economia Internazionale (Genoa), Vol. XXI, No. 1, February 1968, pp. 97–114. Inefficiency is the rule in many less-developed countries. In some of the new states much of the blame for this lies with the former colonial powers, which granted independence too soon - given their failure to build up an indigenous élite.
- Culture and Economics, Economia delle Scelte Pubbliche (Journal of Public Finance and Public Choice), Vol. IV, 1986–3, pp. 157–163. About cultural policy and its instrument, the subsidy. Demand for culture is clearly inelastic.
- The awkward difference between philosophy and reality, European Affairs, vol. 3, no. 1 (1989), pp. 18–23. On planning, plans and programmes.
- The EC's significance for Belgium, Repères - Bulletin Économique et Financier, II/1993, pp. 12–17.
- Globalisation and Africa, Africana (Centro de Estudios Africanos e Orientales, Universidade Portucalense, Porto), March 1999, Iss. 20, pp. 127–149. Inter alia more countries opening their capital markets : the financial liberalisation gives cause for concern (undercapitalised banks).
- Econometrics: an appraisal, Journal of Economic Studies, Aug. 2000, Vol. 27, Iss. 4/5, pp. 316–325. [...] it is not the facts that must be made to fit the theory but vice versa.
- Capitalism and the 2008 crisis, Journal of Public Finance and Public Choice, Vol. XXVI, 2008–2/3, pp. 155–181. This paper considers the factors that lead to the crisis from a specific perspective – essentially the absence of adequate regulation – and is informed by earlier research and by van Meerhaeghe's experience in banking and certain government institutions. Is capitalism the appropriate term when the entire financial system has to be saved by the public sector? Under capitalism, the investor must accept responsibility for the losses he incurs. But the banks received no advice from the universities, even though they were urgently pressed for such assistance. The EU countries have come to realize that the free movement of capital has come too early. With the Brexit looming, Van Meerhaeghe arguments for the Sterling to join the eurozone as soon as possible (despite that the United Kingdom is the only major oil and gas producer in the EU).
