= Guy Schrans =

Guy Schrans (25 November 1937 in Ghent – 27 March 2018) was an emeritus Professor at Ghent University (Ghent, Belgium), liberal politician and lawyer at the Brussels bar.

He was assessor in the department legislation of the Council of State. In addition he was a member of Committee of Directors of the Belgian Protection fund of deposits and financial instruments. He was a member of the Coudenberg group a Belgian federalist think tank.

== Bibliography ==
- Guy Schrans, Vrijmetselaars te Gent in de XVIIIde eeuw, Liberaal Archief, 1997
- Guy Schrans and Ben De Poorter, Telecommunicatie en het Internet: de Gewijzigde Grenzen van het Recht, Mys & Breesch, 2001
- Guy Schrans and Reinhard Steennot, Algemeen deel Financieel recht, Reeks Instituut Financieel Recht, nr. 5, Intersentia, Sept. 2003

== Sources ==
- Guy Schrans (Dutch)
- Guy Schrans (Moniteur Belge)
