= B Plus =

B Plus is a Belgian non profit organization which promotes tolerance and solidarity between the communities of Belgium. The organization supports federalism as a way to organize the Belgian state. Gilles Vanden Burre is the president of the organization.

The organization has several notable members, such as the politicians Willy Claes, Camille Paulus, Ludwig Vandenhove, Hervé Jamar and Pierre Chevalier. In addition, several members out of the Belgian business community, such as baron Daniel Janssen. Several members from the Belgian cultural world, such as José van Dam, Vitalski, Wim Helsen, baroness Monika van Paemel and Benno Barnard. Several journalists, such as Walter Zinzen, Geert van Istendael and Luc Van der Kelen besides sportspeople such as Jacky Ickx. Members from academia, such as Anne Morelli, Raymond Detrez, and Sophie de Schaepdrijver.

== History ==
The organization was founded in 1998.

== See also ==
- Coudenberg group

== Sources ==
- Zinzen, Jamar en Helsen vervoegen B Plus (Dutch)
