= Jacques Groothaert =

Belgian diplomat and entrepreneur (1922–2009)

Baron Jacques Groothaert (1922–2009) was a Belgian diplomat and entrepreneur. He was honorary chairman of the company SA Belge de Constructions Aeronautiques (SABCA), former Ambassador for Belgium to Mexico and China, and chairman of the Generale de Banque. He was a member of the Coudenberg group, a Belgian federalist think tank. In 1984 he founded, together with Lucien Le Lièvre, the American European Community Association (AECA) in Belgium.

== Bibliography ==
- Jacques Groothaert, The implications of 1992 for financial management, The International Executive, Volume 32, Issue 4, Pages 17 – 21
- Jacques Groothaert, L'Europe aux miroirs, Editions Labor, 1996.
- Jacques Groothaert, Le Passage du Témoin, Editions Duculot RTBF, 1991
