= Michel Didisheim =

Belgian aristocrat (1930–2020)

Michel, Count Didisheim (18 April 1930 – 6 January 2020) was the private secretary and chief of the Royal household (1962–1986) of Albert, Prince of Liège, later to become king Albert II of Belgium. He was also the CEO and president of the King Baudouin Foundation (1976–2001).

== His parents ==
Michel Georges Charles Gaspard David Didisheim was born in Kingston-Wimbledon, the son and eldest child of (baron) René Didisheim and Claire Maigret de Priches.

René Didisheim (1907–1994), doctor in law, member of the Bar at the Court of Appeal in Brussels, was Capitaine-Commandant de réserve, Etat-Major second to the Belgian 1st Infantry Brigade, also known by the name of its commander as the Brigade Piron. It was a Belgian infantry formation formed in Great Britain in 1940. It began with Belgian soldiers who had crossed the Channel, and, by the end of 1940 it had expanded to a "fusilier" battalion that played a significant role for the liberation of Belgium and its neighbouring countries of France, Luxembourg and the Netherlands.

Here is a short abstract found on the Brigade Piron's website about René Didisheim:

« Officier d'un moral élevé. Evadé de Belgique en 1941, pour rejoindre les Forces Belges en Grande-Bretagne, a participé à la création et à l'instruction de la 1ère Brigade. Au cours de la campagne de Normandie n'a cessé comme officier de renseignements d'accomplir avec dévouement et intelligence des missions en première ligne. Comme commandant en second d'un bataillon d'infanterie a fait preuve en Hollande de courage et de sang-froid au cours de la campagne, participant personnellement à une patrouille importante ayant permis la prise d'Opheusden ».

(Highly motivated officer. Escaped from Belgium in 1941, to join the Belgian Forces in Great Britain, participated in the creation and training of the 1st Brigade. During the Normandy campaign, as an intelligence officer, he continued to carry out front line missions with dedication and intelligence. As deputy commander of an infantry battalion in Holland demonstrated courage and composure during the campaign, personally participating in a major patrol that led to the capture of Opheusden.)

Claire Maigret de Priches (1906–1983), as an Allied agent and member of the Belgian Resistance, was deported to Ravensbrück German concentration camp for female prisoners in Mecklenburg, northwest of Berlin, established in 1936. Medical experiments were carried out on women at the camp and it was also the place of execution for Allied female agents. There she was committed to the care of the Nazis' sadistic "quacks" in the Ravensbrück concentration camp Experimental Station. The Nazis injected typhus into her blood to make serum. In the typhus block they did not bother to feed prisoners.

Here is a short abstract about her from "Entre les mailles du filet" by Bernadette Jessie Rossion (Copyright 2003 Editions Clepsydre)

Le lendemain, j’ai vu sortir du Revier des malades habillées qu’on allait "trier". Je me tenais près d’un Block et j’assistai à la sinistre opération car j’avais reconnu dans ce groupe Juliette, une compagne de prison, très amicale, que je n’avais plus vue depuis un an. J’avais très envie de lui faire signe mais je ne pouvais pas me faire remarquer et l’heure était grave. Lorsqu’on appela son numéro, je sentis qu’elle faisait des efforts inouïs pour se tenir debout et marcher droit. Angoissée, je retins mon souffle en la voyant s’avancer. À un moment, je sentis qu’elle chancelait, mais elle se reprit et alla spontanément se ranger du côté des Stucken valides. Il n’y eut aucune contradiction et, déjà, on appelait le numéro suivant. Claire Didisheim a survécu : "Juliette" était son nom de guerre.

(The next day, I saw patients coming out of the sickbay who were going to be "sorted". I was standing near a Block and watched the sinister operation because among this group I recognised Juliette, a companion from prison, very friendly, whom I had not seen for a year. I wanted to wave to her but I couldn't make myself obvious and the moment was serious. When her number was called, I felt that she was making an incredible effort to stand up and walk straight. Anxious, I held my breath when I saw her walk forward. At one point I felt that she was tottering, but she recovered and went spontaneously to stand among the able-bodied. There was no contradicting order and the next number was already being called. Claire Didisheim survived: “Juliette” was her nom de guerre.)

The Swedish Red Cross, accompanying Allied liberation troops, found and saved her shortly before the end of the war, together with 7,500 prisoners who were brought to Switzerland and Sweden.

René Didisheim, was conferred hereditary nobility and created 1st Baron Didisheim (hereditary by male primogeniture) on 11 December 1984, for his services rendered to Belgium.

== His sister ==
Michel Didisheim had a sister, Francine Didisheim, (Uccle, 2 March 1933 – Paris, 7 September 2011), married to doctor Bernard de La Gorce. She was co-founder, secretary general and vice-president of the work founded by Father Joseph Wresinski (1917–1988), under the name Mouvement A. T. D. – Quart Monde (Aide à Toute Détresse).

== Marriage and family ==
Michel Didisheim married Monika Eugenie Therese Countess von und zu Trauttmansdorff-Weinsberg (b. Vienna 27 June 1933) in Vienna on 8 February 1956. Monika is the eldest daughter of count Josef Hieronymus Trauttmansdorff (b. Friedau 30 June 1894 – murdered by the Nazis at St.Pölten, Austria on 13 April 1945) who married in Trieste, Italy on 15 October 1932 Helene Economo von San Serff (b. London 1 June 1908 – murdered at St.Pölten, Austria on 13 April 1945).

They have five children: Johannes-Christophe (1956), Frédéric (1958), François (1960), Nathalie (1962) and Florence (1965) and ten grand children.

== Education ==
Michel Didisheim accomplished most of his elementary and secondary schooling in Belgium, with the exception of two terms in 1935–36 at the Marie-José School in Gstaad (Switzerland).

He completed his secondary school education at Monkton Combe School in Somerset (September 1945 – July 1947) where he obtained the 'Oxford and Cambridge Schools Certificate', allowing him to enter higher education.

He graduated from the 'Université Libre de Bruxelles' in 1951 with a Master's degree in Political and Diplomatic Sciences and a Masters in Colonial Sciences. He continued his education through economics courses at the University of Vienna (Austria).

== Service in the Army ==
Entering military service in 1952, Didisheim joined the battalion of Belgian volunteers, formed in 1950 as the "Volunteer Corps Korea", later renamed BUNC, Belgian United Nations Command in Korea. These volunteer soldiers were distinguished by a brown beret, issued only to them. Didisheim commanded a platoon until the armistice was signed, on 27 July 1953.

Due to his university degrees and his thorough knowledge of the English language, he was made a member of the Armistice commission at Panmunyong as the Belgian representative.

He left the army in 1954 as a captain-commander.

== Career ==
He entered civil service as a directorial attaché at SABENA, the Belgian Airlines (1954–1960). He then became staff member at the cabinet of prime minister Gaston Eyskens and subsequently advisor and chief of staff of successive ministers of economic coördination, foreign trade, and cooperation & development.

In 1962 he became the secretary and later the chief of staff of Prince Albert, président of the Belgian Office of Foreign Commerce. In this capacity he participated in the organisation of 65 foreign commercial missions. He was also the main initiator of the Prince's activities in favour of the environment and the architectural heritage.

He also participated actively in the civic education of Prince Philippe, the present king.

== King Baudouin Foundation ==
When Baudouin I (1930–1993) celebrated his 25th anniversary as King of the Belgians, he did not wish to receive a personal gift to mark his jubilee. So it was that the idea of a 'lasting memorial' was born. King Baudouin was very much interested in social problems, had a strong sense of justice and was concerned that society should be harmonious. A Foundation was therefore established to mark his jubilee that would make efforts to ensure better living conditions for the population. The King Baudouin Foundation, an independent public benefit foundation, came into being on 31 March 1976.

Didisheim was one of its co-founders and headed it as its CEO until 1996 and as its president (1996–2001).

This is a quote from La Dernière Heure (31 July 2008):

Pendant vingt-quatre ans il fut le conseiller puis le chef de cabinet du prince Albert. Il a aussi très bien connu le roi Baudouin : "En 1976, le Roi m'a demandé : "Pourriez-vous cumuler le travail que vous faites auprès de mon frère avec la gestion d'une fondation que l'on va créer pour moi?" Michel Didisheim est devenu secrétaire général de la Fondation Roi Baudouin, avant d'en être l'administrateur-délégué puis, jusqu'en 2001, le président. "Je voyais régulièrement le roi Baudouin. Nous avons beaucoup marché ensemble dans le parc de Laeken. Mais je ne peux pas prétendre, pour autant, que nous étions intimes. Très peu de gens étaient des intimes du Roi."

(For twenty-four years he was the counselor and then chief of staff to Prince Albert. He also knew King Baudouin very well: "In 1976, the King asked me: "Could you combine the work you do for my brother with managing a foundation that is being created for me?" Michel Didisheim became secretary general of the King Baudouin Foundation, later being its managing director and, until 2001, its president. "I saw King Baudouin regularly. We walked a lot together in the Laeken park. But I cannot pretend, however, that we were intimate. Very few people were close friends of the King.")

== Associations ==
In 1967, with the support of Prince Albert, Didisheim and a few friends founded the association Quartier des Arts with the objective of enhancing the administrative and cultural heart of the Belgian capital. He was its first president and remained member of the board until 2011.

On 25 September 1971 he was a co-founder of Inter Environnement – Bond Beter Leefmilieu, together with Dominique de Wasseige, Mark Dubrulle, Pierre Dulieu, Jan Tanghe and Baudouin du Bus de Warnaffe. He was its first president.

He was also a member of B Plus, an action group promoting Belgian unity and federalism.

Didisheim is an Honorary Member of the Brussels EU Chapter of the Club of Rome, a non-profit organisation, independent of political, ideological or religious interests. Its essential mission is "to act as a global catalyst for change through the identification and analysis of the crucial problems facing humanity and the communication of such problems to the most important public and private decision makers as well as to the general public."

From 1977 to 1981 he was a lecturer at the 'Université catholique de Louvain', where he created and animated a seminar devoted to the environment. At the College of Europe in Bruges he also created a program devoted to the environment. The Belgian government appointed him as president of the High School of architecture and visual arts La Cambre in Brussels. He was also made a member of the Royal Commission for monuments and sites.

== Honours ==
The coat of arms granted to Michel Didisheim and his male-line descendants.

Didisheim received numerous awards and honours including (in 1996) the Medal of Honour from Europa Nostra, the pan-European Federation for Cultural Heritage, for his dedicated and tireless leadership of heritage conservation, which has served not only to motivate public support in Belgium, but also to act as an inspiration more widely in Europe.

On 18 June 1986, King Baudouin I conferred on Michel Didisheim and all his descendants the hereditary title of Baron, for services rendered to the Belgian dynasty. On 19 July 1996, King Albert II conferred on him and his descendants the title of Count. His armorial motto, a phrase intended to describe his motivation or intention is "Fais face, plus est en toi".

== Bibliography ==
After his retirement, Didisheim took up writing activities.

Under the pseudonym Thomas Valclaren he participated in writing a history of European monarchies during the 19th and 20th Centuries:

- Les Rois ne meurent jamais, with José-Alain Fralon and Linda Caille, Paris, Editions Fayard, 2006

Under his own name he wrote two novels, placed within European aristocratic environments:

- Tu devais disparaitre! Le roman d'une enfant royale cachée, Editions Alphee, 2008, ISBN 978-2-7538-0336-7
- Pour le sourire d'une tortue, Tome 2 of Tu devais disparaître..., Editions Alphee, 2010, ISBN 978-2-7538-0572-9

== Literature ==
- Gaspard MAIGRET DE PRICHES, Les de Priches dans l'ancien comté de Hainaut (1295–1710), Mons, 1950
- Gaspard MAIGRET DE PRICHES, La Famille Maigret, Maigret de Priches, Bruxelles, 1958
- R. HARMIGNIES, Les armoiries des officiers belges anoblis, in: Le Parchemin, 1996
- Humbert DE MARNIX DE SAINTE ALDEGONDE, État présent de la noblesse belge. Annuaire de 2005, Brussel, 2005
- Luc TAYART DE BORMS & Dominique ALLARD, In memoriam Michel Didisheim, in: Bulletin de l'Association de la Noblesse du Royaume de Belgique, april 2020.

== Sources ==
- Improving living conditions (King Baudouin Foundation)
- Europe of Culture forum
- Europa Nostra
- Le Monde
- Brigade Piron
