= Jacques De Staercke =

Belgian businessman and politician (1927–2017)

Baron Jacques De Staercke (1927–2017) was a Belgian businessman and politician. He was a member of the Coudenberg group, a Belgian federalist think tank.

He was a politician for the Christelijke Volkspartij / Parti Social Chrétien (CVP-PSC) from 1945 until 1972 and of the Nationaal Comité voor Vrijheid en Democratie from 1954 onward.

== Fabrimetal ==
De Staercke was a leading figure in Fabrimetal, the Belgian federation of metalworking industries (since renamed Agoria). His fifteen years of policy there were the subject of a 1987 book published in French as Un combat pour l'entreprise: Jacques de Staercke, 15 ans de politique de Fabrimétal and in Dutch as Jacques De Staercke, opdracht: ondernemen.

== Sources ==
- Claude Carboneel, Jacques De Staercke, opdracht: ondernemen, vijftien jaar Fabrimetal-beleid, Lannoo, Tielt, 1987
- Jacques De Staercke
