= Felix Standaert =

Belgian diplomat and ambassador

Felix Standaert is a Belgian diplomat and former Belgian ambassador to Rwanda and 1977–1980 to the Holy See. He was a member of the Coudenberg group, a Belgian federalist think tank.

== Sources ==
- Discours de l’ambassadeur Felix Standaert au Pape Paul VI à l’occasion de la présentation de ses lettres de créance (1977)
