= Jan Huyghebaert =

Belgian businessman

Jan, Baron Huyghebaert (born 1945) is a Belgian businessman. He was a member of the Coudenberg group, a Belgian federalist think tank.

== Education ==
He obtained a degree in Philosophy, Language and Literature from the University of Antwerp (Antwerp, Belgium) and a doctorate in Law from the Katholieke Universiteit Leuven (Leuven, Belgium).

== Career ==
During his career, he held various government functions, including as adviser to the Belgian Prime Minister, Leo Tindemans, and as Alderman of the Port of Antwerp. He was President of the Executive Committee of the Kredietbank (forerunner of KBC) from 1985 to 1991 and was appointed Chairman of the Board of Directors of Almanij in 1991. He is Chairman of the Board of Directors (term expires in 2008) of the KBC Group and in addition, he is Chairman of the Board of Directors of KB Luxembourg. Mr Huyghebaert served as a Director of NV Bekaert SA until 14 May 2014.

== Sources ==
- Jan Huyghebaert (Reuters)
- Bilderberg meetings (1999)
