= Gerard Bodifee =

Belgian astronomer

Gerard Bodifee (born 7 February 1946 in Mortsel) is a Belgian astrophysicist, writer, and Christian philosopher.

== Education ==
After studying chemistry at the universities of Antwerp and Ghent, Bodifee studied astronomy, focusing on star formation. At the University of Brussels he conducted scientific research on the origin and evolution of galaxies and obtained a PhD in science with a doctoral thesis titled Oscillating Star Formation and Dissipative Structures in Galaxies.

== Career ==
As acting managing director of the National Planetarium, associated to the Royal Observatory of Belgium in Brussels, Bodifee drew up several programmes for national education. He also presented a television series on stars and celestial phenomena on VRT, National Television Belgium. He was also a chemistry teacher at the Saint-Rita high school in Kontich.

Bodifee became a well-known writer and columnist for the weekly magazine Knack and the newspaper De Standaard. He often used irony and was inspired by Christian philosophy.

Currently, Bodifee writes and lectures in Belgium and abroad. He founded the House for Philosophy, and gives courses on the origins of western culture. He links ancient philosophy with modern science. Bodifee has published over twenty books on science, philosophy, and religion.

== Family ==
Bodifee is married to Lucette Verboven. She works as an interviewer for several television programmes in Belgium (KTRO) and the Netherlands (KRO) and is the author of several religious books.

== Works ==
Most of Bodifee's publications are in Dutch, although some of his more recent works are also published in English.

=== Science, religion, and philosophy ===
- Algemene sterrenkunde (General Astronomy, 1977, together with T. Dethier and E. Wojciulewitsch): A handbook of astronomy for students and amateur astronomers.
- Het Vreemde van de Aarde (Strange Earth, 1986): Bodifee suggests that life on earth is a self-organizing dissipative structure that transforms the environment on this planet into a state far from chemical equilibrium. He concludes no other place in the Solar System is in such a remarkable condition.
- Ruimte voor Vrijheid (Room for Freedom, 1988): discusses the capability of living beings to act spontaneously and autonomously
- Aandacht en Aanwezigheid (Attention and Existence, 1991): This book regards attention as a creative force in an unfinished world and explores the conflict between science and religion. Human being have always analyzed their world, thus engaging in a scientific act, but the author contends that for a realistic understanding of the world, also an exploration out of intuition, empathy and commitment is necessary.
- Op de Rand van een Vulkaan (On the Edge of the Volcano, 1992): On the volcanic island of Stromboli, Bodifee and journalist Frans Verleyen discuss social, moral, and religious issues, especially the question whether to deal with the world by reason, by feeling, or by faith.
- In Beginsel (In Principle, 1993): a personal testimony on religion in general and Christian belief in particular.
- Klassieken van de Wetenschap (Classics of Science, 1994): A short presentation of thirty classical works from the history of science from Plato to Prigogine, together with Bodifee's reflections on them.
- Met het Oog op Mars (With an Eye on Mars, 1997): a historical survey and a round-up of the present state of knowledge of Mars.
- Natuurlijke Ongehoorzaamheid (Natural Disobedience, 1997): discusses the relation of man to biological nature in the context of the evolution of life on earth.
- Eclips (Eclipse, 1999): A book about the solar eclipse of August 11, 1999 and solar eclipses in general.
- Weg van Duizend Jaar (Road of Thousand Years, 2000): On the occasion of the change of the millennium, Bodifee discusses Franciscan theologian Bonaventure, alive at the start of the millennium, and the Jesuit Teilhard de Chardin, alive at its end.
- Tot Bestaan Bestemd (Meant to Be, 2003): discusses science and religion.
- Weg uit de Leegte (Europe's Inner Void, 2005): Convinced that the spiritual crisis of present-day secular Europe forces us to ponder the nature of religion, Bodifee asks what a culture loses when it loses its religion.
- God en het gesteente (God and Granite, 2007): discusses what is meant by God and nature.
- CMG. A Catalogue of One Thousand Named Galaxies (2010) and CNG. Catalogue of Named Galaxies: A catalog of galaxies for amateur astronomers proposing names in the style of traditional astronomical naming conventions.

=== Philosophical fiction ===
- Dialoog over de Verbeterde Staat van de Wereld (Dialogue about the Improvable State of the World, 1995): Four characters discuss the world as each of them experiences it and give their views about what should be done to realize a more just world including the subjects of ambition and powerlessness, attainable truths, and the tragedy of human deficiency.
- Diotima (2008): A mysterious young woman meets a street musician and tells him she loves him as no one has ever loved anyone before. The books main themes involve Platonic love and desire, cosmology, biology, and evolution.

=== Compilations of columns ===
Bodifee published columns in the literary supplement of the Belgian journal De Standaard, in the Belgian weekly magazine Knack, and elsewhere.

- Reflecties (Reflections, 1989)
- Momenten onder de Melkweg (Moments under the Milky Way, 1990)
- Het Zichtbare en het Denkbare (The Visible and the Thinkable, 1990)
- Resonanties (Resonances, 1991)
- Tot mijn Verwondering (To My Astonishment, 2001)
- Nocturnes: Nachtelijke gedachten over de mens, de kosmos en God (Nocturnes: Nightly Thinking about Man, Cosmos, and God, 2010)
