= Jurgen Del-Favero =

Jurgen Del-Favero is a Belgian scientist working at the VIB Department of Molecular Genetics at the University of Antwerp. His research is directed towards the identification of susceptibility genes for psychiatric disorders and tools for DNA sequence research. His research, in collaboration with the Swedish research group under the direction of Rolf Adolfsson, indicated that the TPH2 protein is involved in the development of depression and bipolar disorder.

He obtained a PhD at the Vrije Universiteit Brussel (Brussels, Belgium) in 1995. He has been VIB Group leader since 2003 and is Associate Professor at the University of Antwerp since 2005.

== Sources ==
- Jurgen Del-Favero
- J. Comijn, P. Raeymaekers, A. Van Gysel, M. Veugelers, Today = Tomorrow : a tribute to life sciences research and innovation : 10 years of VIB, Snoeck, 2006, ISBN 978-90-5349-630-5, pp. 70–72 and p. 258.
