= Vincent Timmerman =

Vincent Timmerman is a Belgian scientist working at the VIB Department of Molecular Genetics at the University of Antwerp of Christine Van Broeckhoven. His research is focused on inherited disorders of the peripheral nervous system, classified as hereditary motor and/or sensory neuropathies and the most common inherited peripheral neuropathy is Charcot–Marie–Tooth (CMT) disease or Hereditary Motor and Sensory Neuropathy (HMSN).

Vincent Timmerman obtained a PhD at the University of Antwerp in 1993 and is VIB Group leader since 1999. He became Associate Professor, at the University of Antwerp since 2002.

On 22 May 2007 Vincent Timmerman and Peter De Jonghe received the Solvay Prize for their work on Charcot-Marie-Tooth disease

== Sources ==
- Vincent Timmerman
