= Harry Gordon Johnson =

Canadian economist

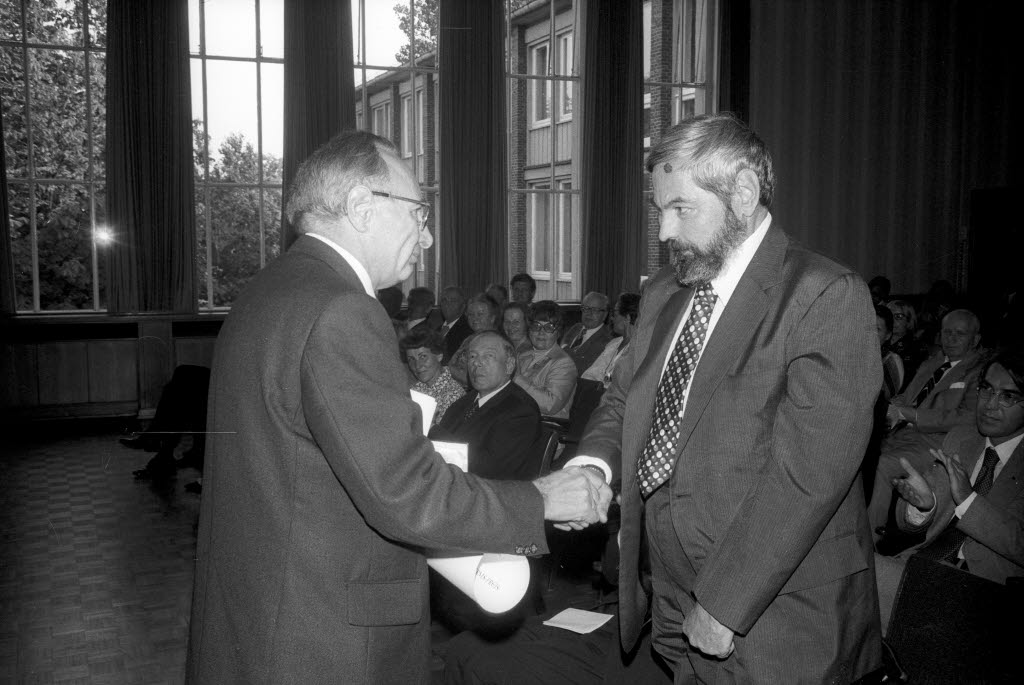
- Harry Gordon Johnson 1976 in Kiel, Germany
- Born: May 26, 1923; Toronto, Ontario, Canada
- Died: May 9, 1977 (aged 53); Geneva, Switzerland

Academic background
- Education: University of Cambridge, University of Toronto, Harvard University
- Doctoral advisor: James Duesenberry
- Influences: Joseph Schumpeter

Academic work
- Discipline: Economics
- School or tradition: Monetarism
- Institutions: University of Chicago, London School of Economics, Graduate Institute of International and Development Studies

Harry Gordon Johnson, OC (26 May 1923 – 9 May 1977) was a Canadian economist who studied topics such as international trade and international finance.

Nobel laureate James Tobin said about him: "For the economics profession throughout the world, the third quarter of this century was an Age of Johnson. ... It was his impact on his own profession ... that justifies calling the era his Age."

Appointed professor of economics at Manchester University in 1956, he left upon being appointed Professor of Economics at the University of Chicago from 1959 (and from 1969, the Charles F. Grey Distinguished Service Professor) until his death in 1977. He was also Professor of Economics at the London School of Economics from 1966 until 1974. And he briefly was professor at the Graduate Institute of International Studies in Geneva until his death. He was twice Editor of the Journal of Political Economy. He had a stroke at age 49 and died prematurely from a second stroke at age 53.

In 1976 the Canadian government named him an officer of the Order of Canada and in 1977 he was named a distinguished fellow of the American Economic Association.

The Canadian Economics Association awards an annual Harry G. Johnson Prize for the best paper published in the Canadian Journal of Economics.

== Early life and education ==
He was born on 26 May 1923 in Toronto, Ontario, Canada, the elder son of two children of Henry Herbert Johnson, newspaperman and later secretary of the Liberal Party of Ontario, and his wife, Frances Lily Muat, lecturer in child psychology at the Institute of Child Study of the University of Toronto.

Johnson was educated at the University of Toronto schools and then obtained scholarships to the University of Toronto, where he studied law and economics. According to W. Max Corden in the Oxford Dictionary of Biography, it was at this time that he "developed an interest in the history of thought and was much influenced by Harold Innis's lectures and ideas on Canadian and generalized economic history." He graduated in 1943 and subsequently became, for one year, acting professor and sole member of the economics staff at St Francis Xavier University, in Antigonish, Nova Scotia. "In 1944", explains Corden, "Johnson volunteered for active service in the Canadian armed forces and, after training, was sent to England in 1945, eventually doing clerical work in Canada House." This was then followed by further study at Jesus College, Cambridge, where he obtained a first-class BA degree in economics under the tutelage of the Marxist economist Maurice Dobb; a return to the University of Toronto, where he earned his MA degree; and then finally doctoral research at Harvard University, where he completed the course work requirements in three terms. It was while at Harvard that he became a follower of the ideas of Joseph Schumpeter.

In 1948 he married Elizabeth Scott, daughter of Harold Victor Serson, civil engineer. She later became one of the editors of the collected writings of Keynes. They had one son and one daughter.

== Career ==
He held permanent teaching positions throughout Europe and Canada, as well as visiting positions at universities worldwide. Notable were his time with Chicago from 1959 to 1977, also during 1966–74 he worked at the London School of Economics. He also held a visiting professorship at Queen's University in Kingston, Ontario and he briefly was professor at the Graduate Institute of International Studies in Geneva until his death.

Physically, he was a large man, overweight or at least stout, with piercing dark brown eyes. But he was far from sluggish, and gave an impression of intense and disciplined intellectual and physical energy. He was often loudly and informally dressed. His energy was kept under control by his continuous carving of wooden statuettes, of which he made thousands in many different artistic styles. He carved at seminars and in his room, throughout the discussions of intricate economic problems.

Economist Jagdish Bhagwati, writing about Johnson's productivity and accessibility, said, "Countless numbers of manuscripts would reach him, from aspiring students of international economics and somehow Harry found the energy and time to read them carefully and write back to the authors promptly. ... once ... when he was staying with us, my wife asked him what he had been doing in the early hours of the morning when we had been still asleep. 'I read two manuscripts, one indifferent and the other bad; what is worse, I could have written one good paper in that time.' "

He was a strong drinker and his reputation at London School of Economics and Political Science was that he travelled weekly between London and Chicago, and he would enter each flight with a bottle of Southern Comfort and would leave it with a fully written paper! According to Moggeridge he was often deeply intoxicated whilst attending seminars and workshops. Despite his prolific writing, he was criticized for essentially rewriting the same articles over and over. George Stigler was asked about Johnson's 500 published papers versus his 100. Stigler replied, "Yes, but mine were all different."

Harry Johnson died of a stroke in Geneva on 9 May 1977; he was survived by his wife. The enormous admiration and affection for Johnson was reflected in the numerous obituaries by members of the economics profession that appeared soon afterwards. "For the economics profession throughout the world, the third quarter of this century was an Age of Johnson" (Tobin 443). "He bestrode our discipline like a Colossus", "He was an institution" (ibid.). "Canada lost one of its greatest sons". He was "larger than life' (the most common remark). "The one and only Harry" (The Economist, 14 May 1977, 121).

== Legacy ==
Johnson made many contributions to the development of Hecksher-Ohlin theory and until the 1970s according to Moggeridge, was the second most quoted trade theorist after Paul Samuelson. Johnson also helped to found the monetary approach to the balance of payments and wrote many high quality surveys of monetary economics that helped to clarify the issues in question. Despite being perhaps the most prolific economist of the modern era, Johnson's star has waned as is evidenced by the significant fall (discussed in Moggeridge's biography) in citations to his work in the past decade.

The Canadian Economics Association presents a Harry Johnson Prize every year for the best article to appear in the Canadian Journal of Economics in the preceding year.

== Opinions ==
He retained a lifelong interest in Canadian politics and was heavily critical of nationalist and interventionist policies that prevailed at his time.

In his policy-oriented writings, he clearly showed his beliefs in personal freedom and markets.

== Selected works ==
=== Writings ===
Johnson published many works on international and monetary economics theory. He also wrote many works aimed at the general public and policymakers.

According to Paul Samuelson, when Johnson died he had eighteen papers in proof: "That is dying with your boots on!" said Samuelson

Johnson earned many honours. In 1977 he was named a distinguished fellow of the American Economic Association, and in 1976 the Canadian government named him an officer of the Order of Canada.

Johnson wrote a large number of books and articles, the total of his writings were:

- 526 professional articles
- 41 books and pamphlets
- 1953. "Optimum Tariffs and Retaliation." Review of Economic Studies 21, no. 2: 142–153.
- 1958. "Demand Theory Further Revised or Goods Are Goods." Economica, 2, 98: 149.
- 1959. "British Monetary Statistics." Economica 26 (February): 1–17.
- 1961. "The 'General Theory' After Twenty-five Years." American Economic Review 51 (May): 1–17.
- 1963. The Canadian Quandary: Economic Problems and Policies. Toronto: McGraw-Hill.
- 1968. Economic Policies Towards Less Developed Countries. London.
- 1969. Essays in Monetary Economics. 2d ed. Cambridge: Harvard University Press.
- 1969. "Financial and monetary problems: Britain and the EEC", in Economics: Britain and the EEC. London: Longmans (Ed. by M.A.G. van Meerhaeghe).
- 1971. "The Keynesian Revolution and the Monetarist Counter-revolution." American Economic Review 61 (May): 1–14.
- 1972. Further Essays in Monetary Economics. London: George Allen and Unwin.
- 1973. The Theory of Income Distribution. London: Gray-Mills.

=== Bibliography ===
- Donald Moggridge: Harry Johnson. A Life in Economics. New York: Cambridge University Press, 2008. ISBN 978-0521874823. Review Article by Deena Khatkhate, EPW.
- Henderson, David R., ed. (2008). "Harry Gordon Johnson (1923–1977 )". The Concise Encyclopedia of Economics. Library of Economics and Liberty (2nd ed.). Liberty Fund. p. 547. ISBN 978-0865976665.
