= Anthony Liekens =

Belgian inventor and educator

- Born: 12 December 1975; Sint Niklaas, Belgium
- Known for: Team Scheire
- Scientific career
- Fields: Engineering, Electronics
- Institutions: Eindhoven University of Technology; University of Antwerp; IO lab Makerspace Antwerpen
- Website: anthony.liekens.net

Anthony Liekens (born 12 December 1975) is a Belgian computer scientist, biologist, inventor and educator.

== Life and career ==
Anthony Liekens obtained his master's in computer science at Vrije Universiteit Brussel in 2000 with extra curricular courses at the University of Antwerp and obtained his PhD in biomedical technology at Eindhoven University of Technology in 2005.

== Projects ==
=== Hackerspace ===
Liekens operates the Open Garage hackerspace, residing as Belgian national radio's scientist where he shares educational knowledge with the community.

=== Vlaams Woordenboek (Flemish Dictionary) ===
In September 2007, Liekens launched Vlaams Woordenboek, a website with the aim of establishing an online Flemish dialectal dictionary.

=== Fri3d Camp ===
In 2014, Liekens launched Fri3d Camp, a 2-yearly family-friendly hacker camp that is seen as the main Belgian hacker camp.

=== Corona Denktank ===
In March 2020, days before the COVID-19 lockdown in Belgium, Liekens founded Corona Denktank, a civil movement that designed and built alternative solutions to lessen the suffering and to reduce the spread of the virus. Under his leadership, the movement grew to tens of thousands of contributors. Over its two months of operation, Corona Denktank initiated over 40 projects, including the distributed production of homemade facemasks, the launch of Praatbox, a barrier-free videoconferencing tool without accounts which quickly grew to 40 thousand users per day, collected and distributed 15 thousand laptops to school children. and collaborated together with king Philippe of Belgium to honor heroes of the pandemic.

== Selected academic works ==
Most-cited papers:

- 2011. Optimized filtering reduces the error rate in detecting genomic variants by short-read sequencing, Nature biotechnology. According to GoogleScholar, this paper has been cited 237 times
- 2011. BioGraph: unsupervised biomedical knowledge discovery via automated hypothesis generation, Genome Biology. According to GoogleScholar, this paper has been cited 136 times
- 2009. Molecular circuits for associative learning in single-celled organisms, Journal of the Royal Society Interface. According to GoogleScholar, this paper has been cited 132 times

== Personal life ==
He is married and has 2 children.
