= Bart De Schutter =

Bart De Schutter is a Belgian scientist and was a member of the Coudenberg group, a federalist think tank.

== Education ==
He graduated as Doctor in Law from the Vrije Universiteit Brussel (VUB) in 1959. In addition he obtained a MA in Political and Diplomatic Sciences from the Universite Libre de Bruxelles in 1960. In 1961, he obtained an LL.M. from Harvard University (United States). In Strasbourg (France), he followed the Special Programme on European Organizations at the Faculté Internationale pour l'Enseignement du Droit Comparé and in Geneva the United Nations International Law Commission Seminar.

== Career ==
He started his career at the VUB where he became Dean of the Faculty of Law and Rector. In addition, he was member of the Board of Directors of the VUB and President of the Board of the VRT, the Flemish Public Radio and Television network. Since 1971 until 2003, he has been Director of the IES-VUB Programme on international legal cooperation of the Vrije Universiteit Brussel. He also co-initiated a similar programme at the Anglia Polytechnic University (Law School at Cambridge) of which he is Honorary Fellow.

He is the Belgian representative at the Joint Supervisory Body of Europol and Schengen since 1997. Since 2001, he is the Belgian representative in the Joint Supervisory Authority of the EU Customs Information System. In 2001, he became the founding President of the Institute for European Studies of the VUB, until he got replaced by Karel de Gucht in 2015. Since 2005, he is Chairman of the Erasmus Hogeschool Brussel. He is a Member of the Belgian Data Protection Authority.

== Sources ==
- Bart De Schutter
- Bart De Schutter
