= Mark Dubrulle =

Mark Dubrulle (Ghent, Belgium, 26 January 1943) is a Belgian consultant and environmentalist.

== Biography ==
Dubrulle was trained at the Naval School in Ostend (B) and spent two years at sea. His academic background is in psychology and sociology at the Social Academy of his hometown Ghent.

He has been involved in environmental activism and environmental protection for more than 40 years. His professional experience includes environmental management, communication strategies and European affairs. He is an ex-officio Member of the Club of Rome, was President of the Club of Rome EU Chapter (Brussels) until 2019, and is now President Emeritus. He has been a Committee member of ECOROPA, a green think tank, since 1977. He was President of GreenFacts-Communicating Scientific Facts on Health and Environment from 2005 to 2009. He was co-founder and Chairman of the Europe of Cultures Forum from 2004 to 2010.

A founding member of the Belgian confederation of nature conservation and environmental organisations, Mark Dubrulle was National Secretary of the Bond Beter Leefmilieu / Inter-environnement from 1970 to 1980, an activist group which he co-founded, together with Michel Didisheim and half a dozen friends. He was a co-founder and, from 1980 to 1982, the first Secretary of the Flemish green party AGALEV (presently Groen!).

Appointed Managing Director of Hill and Knowlton International Belgium in 1980, he left this leading PR/PA agency to start his own consultancy in 1986. Until 1998 he was managing director of EMSA Europe S.A., Environmental Management Strategies and Analysis. He presently is managing director of Dubrulle s.c.r.l., a cooperative services consultancy specialized in environmental affairs and sustainable development.

He lectured at several universities in Belgium, France, Italy and the U.K. He was a Belgian delegate at the first UN Conference on the Human Environment in Stockholm (1972), is a Past President of the European Society for Environment and Development (ESED), stood on the Policy Committee of the International Council for Oil and the Environment (ICOE) in Edinburgh.

He has been active in many federalist movements and think tanks: Beweging voor de Verenigde Staten van Europa, Centre d’études pour les communes et les provinces/ Studiecentrum voor steden en gemeenten, Coudenberg group, Front voor Unionistisch Federalisme/Front pour le fédéralisme d’Union, and B Plus.

In the seventies and eighties he worked closely with the Swiss philosopher Denis de Rougemont as a counsellor of the Centre Européen de la Culture.

He is a member of the Dutch/Flemish Comité voor Buitenlands Cultureel Beleid and president of the section County of Namur of the cultural organisation Orde van den Prince.

== Bibliography ==
Mark Dubrulle is the author of numerous articles on environmental issues, communication, Europe and cultural identities. Also of:

- Future European Environmental Legislation and Subsidiarity, Mark Dubrulle editor, European Interuniversity Press – PIE, 1992
- Régionalisme, Fédéralisme, Ecologisme: de nouvelles bases culturelles et économiques pour l'union de l'Europe, (Presses Interuniversitaires européennes 1995)
- Impasses et perspectives de l’écologie politique, Editions Cerès, Toulouse, 1997
- Identités culturelles et citoyenneté européenne, P.I.E. Peter Lang AG, 2009
