= Hans Vangheluwe =

Hans L.M. Vangheluwe
- Born: August 15, 1963 (age 63); Belgium
- Education: University of Ghent
- Known for: Scientific contributions to Modeling and Simulation, Public Speeches
- Title: Professor
- Scientific career
- Fields: Computational Science and Engineering
- Workplaces: University of Antwerp, McGill University

Hans L.M. Vangheluwe is a professor and researcher in the domain of computer simulation and modelling. He is currently professor at the University of Antwerp in Belgium, and at McGill University, Montreal. He was a co-founder of Modelica, a language for the acausal modelling of complex systems and computer automated multiparadigm modeling.

== Career ==
Vangheluwe has a masters in physics from the University of Ghent (1986), followed by a masters in computer science (1988). He then worked at the University of Ghent as a research assistant under supervision of professor Ghislain Vansteenkiste, working in the area of biometrics and control engineering. He then was called up for military service, where he served as one of the two detaches in the "Beheerseenheid van het Mathematisch Model van de Noordzee en het Schelde Estuarium (BMM)" of the Belgian Navy, showing his proficiency in simulation of the physical world. He obtained a FWO grant to work in the Concurrent Engineering Research Center (CERC) in Morgantown, West Virginia in 1996. Vangheluwe was employed at the University of Ghent as a project leader between 1994 and 1999. He received his PhD in science in 2000 at the University of Ghent. Afterwards, he started working as an assistant professor in the School of Computer Science at McGill University, Montreal, Quebec, Canada. In 2005, he was named a tenured professor at McGill University. In 2009, Vangheluwe returned to Belgium to work as a full professor at the University of Antwerp, Belgium.

He has contributed in topics such as the modelling of wastewater treatment, tool-building for model-driven engineering, DEVS and model transformation
