= Guy Routh =

Gerald Guy Cumming Routh (1916 Krugersdorp, South Africa – 1993 Brighton) was an economist whose academic career was spent largely at the University of Sussex, United Kingdom. He also had a spell at the ILO as a visiting associate at the IILS.

== Early life ==
His father, Charles Edward Arthur Routh (born in Salonika 1876), joined Imperial Yeomanry for the Boer War, serving in the elite unit 19th Coy. Paget's Horse, and stayed in South Africa after the war. He married Ethel Annie Cumming there and eventually settled in Krugersdorp, where he was superintendent of the hospital for the West Rand Consolidated Mine. He died of a heart attack when Guy was only 8, leaving three children fatherless. Guy eventually attended and graduated from the nearby Witwatersrand University in 1938 with a bachelor's degree in commerce.

== Key works ==
He is most noted for his The Origin of Economic Ideas

- Routh, Guy (1965) Occupation and Pay in Great Britain: 1906-60
- Routh, Guy (1975) The Origin of Economic Ideas, London : Macmillan
- Routh, Guy (1984) Economics, an Alternative Text
- Routh, Guy (1984) What to teach to undergraduates, in Wiles, Peter and Routh, G. (Eds) Economics in Disarray, Oxford : Basil Blackwell
- Routh, Guy (1986) Unemployment: Economic Perspectives, London: Palgrave Macmillan

== Reviews ==
- Guy Routh. The Origin of Economic Ideas. Pp. vii, 321. White Plains, Reviewed The Annals of the American Academy of Political and Social Science 1976; 428;
- Lichtenstein, Peter M. Journal of Economic Issues; Mar78, Vol. 12 Issue 1, p201-204, 4p Book Review of Guy Routh. The Origin of Economic Ideas.
