= Geert van Istendael =

Belgian writer

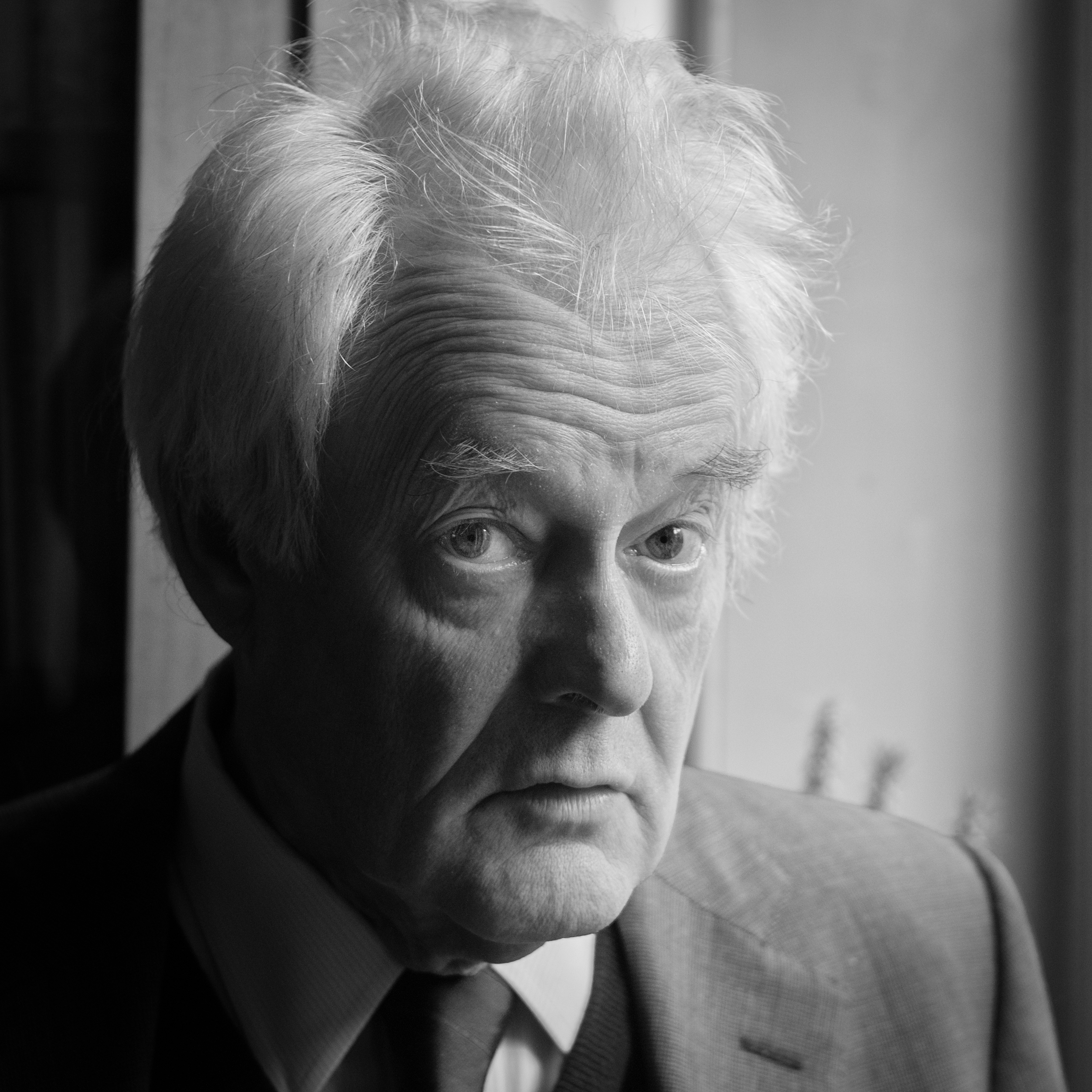
- Van Istendael in 2017
- Born: Geert Maria Mauritius Julianus Vanistendael; 29 March 1947 (age 79); Uccle, Belgium
- Occupation: writer
- Children: Judith Vanistendael
- Relatives: Frans Vanistendael (brother)

Geert van Istendael (born 29 March 1947) is the pseudonym of Geert Maria Mauritius Julianus Vanistendael, a Belgian writer, poet and essayist. He studied sociology and philosophy at the Katholieke Universiteit Leuven. From 1987 until 1993, he worked as a journalist for the Belgian National Television and since 1993 he became a full-time writer. He is a brother of Frans Vanistendael. He is a supporter of Orangism and a Pan-Netherlands.

== Bibliography ==
- 1983 De iguanodons van Bernissart. (poems)
- 1987 Plattegronden. Amsterdam (poems).
- 1989 Het Belgisch labyrint, of De schoonheid der wanstaltigheid. (essays)
- 1991 Verhalen van het heggeland. (stories)
- 1992 Arm Brussel. Amsterdam (essays)
- 1994 Bekentenissen van een reactionair. (essays)
- 1995 Vlaamse sprookjes. (fairytales)
- 1996 Het geduld van de dingen. (poems)
- 1997 Altrapsodie. (novel)
- 1997 Anders is niet beter. (essays)
- 1999 Nieuwe uitbarstingen. (essays)
- 2001 Alle uitbarstingen. (columns)
- 2003 De zwarte steen. (novel)
- 2005 Mijn Nederland. (essays)
- 2006 Alfabet van de globalisering. (essays)
- 2007: Mijn Duitsland (essays)
- 2008: Kerstverhaal (with Judith Vanistendael)
- 2009: Gesprekken met mijn dode god
- 2010: Tot het Nederlandse volk
- 2012: Een geschiedenis van België

== Awards ==
- 1995 – Geuzenprijs with Paul de Leeuw

== See also ==
- Flemish literature

== Sources ==
- Geert van Istendael
