= Els Witte =

Belgian historian (born 1941)

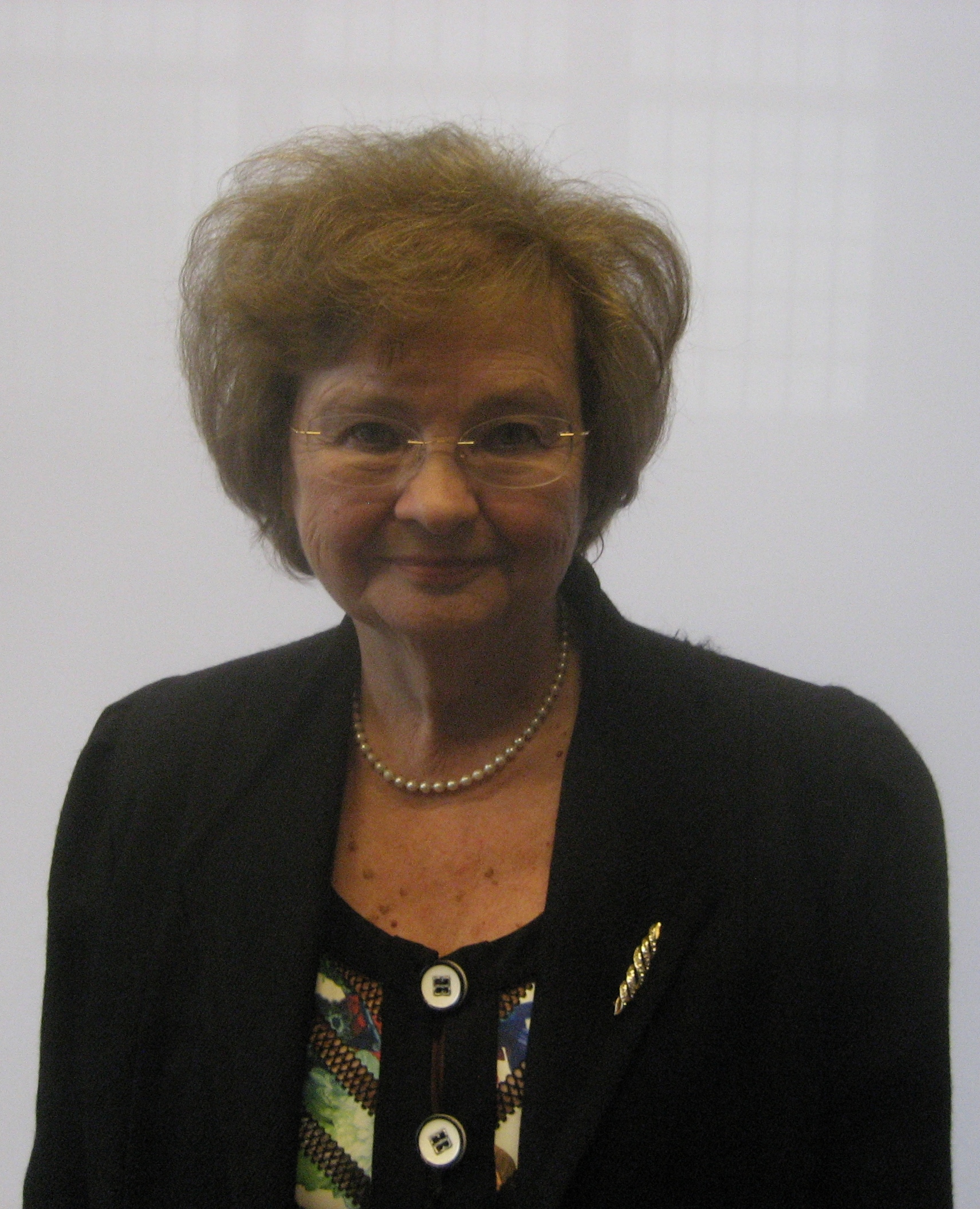

Academic work
- Discipline: history

Els, Baroness Witte (born 30 September 1941, Borgerhout) is a Belgian historian. She was professor at the Vrije Universiteit Brussel and honorary rector of the university. Els Witte was the first female rector of a Belgian university. She was a member of the Coudenberg group, a Belgian federalist think tank.

== Career ==
She started her career as an assistant at the University of Ghent (Ghent, Belgium). In 1974 she joined the in 1969 newly founded Vrije Universiteit Brussel as a full-time historian. Between 1994 and 2000, she was Rector of the Vrije Universiteit Brussel. In the course of her career, she was also President of the board of the Belgian Radio and Television (now: Flemish Radio and Television Network VRT).

== Bibliography ==
- Els Witte, Jan Craeybeckx, Alain Meynen, Political History of Belgium from 1830 Onwards, VUB Brussels University Press, July 2001
- Els Witte, Els Witte, Rectorale redevoeringen, VUB Brussels University Press
- Els Witte, Het verloren koninkrijk. Het harde verzet van de Belgische orangisten tegen de revolutie. 1828-1850, Antwerpen, 2014

== Sources ==
- Els Witte
- Els Witte (in Dutch)
