= Michel van den Abeele =

Belgian chairman

Michel, Baron van den Abeele (born 30 April 1942) is a former Director-General of the European Commission, is actually chairman of the board of the Belgian public owned company APETRA and active in several Belgian charities.

== Education ==
He obtained a master's degree in Economics at the Université libre de Bruxelles (ULB).

== Career ==
From 1973 until 1976 he was Deputy Head and then Head of Cabinet of Vice- President Henri Simonet. From 1976 until 1978, he was advisor to François-Xavier Ortoli, President of the European Commission. In 1978, he was advisor to President Roy Jenkins. In 1981, he was advisor to President Gaston Thorn. From 1981 until 1986, he was Advisor in the Secretariat-General and then in the EU Directorate-General for Development. From 1986 until 1989, he was Head of Division UNCTAD and Commodities at the Directorate-General for Development. From 1982 until 1992, he was head of the cabinet of EU Commissioner Karel Van Miert and again from 1995 until 1996. From 1992 until 1994, he was Deputy Director-General of the EU Directorate-General Budgets. From 1996 until 1997 he was Director-General of DG Enterprise Policy, Distributive Trades, Tourism and Cooperatives. From 1997 until 2002, he was Director-General of DG Taxation and Customs Union. From 2002 until 2003, he was Director-General of DG Translation. From 2003 until 2004, he was Director-General of DG Eurostat. From 2004 to 2007 he was Permanent Representative of the European Commission to the Organisation for Economic Co-operation and Development and UNESCO.

== Academic activities ==
Honorary part-time professor at the Université libre de Bruxelles in European financial matters. He lectured in various universities: Aix-Marseilles, Bordeaux and École Nationale d'Administration. Docteur honoris causa of the Université de Provence.

== Sources ==
- Michel van den Abeele
- Michel van den Abeele (report of Belgian senate)
- Michel van den Abeele (photo OECD)
