= Institute of Development Policy and Management =

Coordinates: 51.22349°N 4.41007°E

The Institute of Development Policy (IOB) is an independent institute of the University of Antwerp in Antwerp, Belgium. The institute is involved in academic teaching, scientific research and service to the community in the area of economic, political and social aspects of development policy and management.

The institute offers three master programs in Development Evaluation and Management, Governance and Development, and Globalisation and Development.

== See also ==
- Royal Academy of Overseas Sciences
- Economic development
- International development
