= Judith Vanistendael =

Belgian comics artist

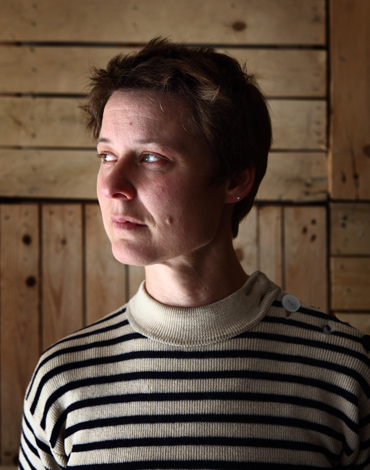
- Judith Vanistendael en 2016.
- Born: Judith Irene Vanistendael; 21 August 1974; Leuven
- Occupation: Illustrator
- Awards: Willy Vandersteenprijs (2021); Bronzen Adhemar (2022); Prix Saint-Michel (2007)
- Website: judithvanistendael.wordpress.com

Judith Vanistendael (born 21 August 1974, Leuven) is a Dutch-speaking Belgian comics author, illustrator, and teacher in comics art. She also worked for a time as a children's book illustrator.

== Early life and education ==
Judith Irene Vanistendael is the daughter of the Flemish poet-journalist Geert van Istendael. After her secondary studies, she attended an art school in Ghent, and spent a year at the Academy of Fine Arts in Berlin. Returning to Ghent, she resumed artistic studies for four years before continuing her studies in Seville, Spain. She learned comics creation at the Institut des arts graphiques Sint-Lukas Bruxelles in 2000, with teachers, Nix and Johan De Moor before publishing in journals such as Ink, Demo, Zone 53001, and Bruxxxel Noord.

== Career ==
Vanistendael's career began with the illustration of Flemish tales written by her father, Vlaamse Sprookjes (1995), then Het Koeienboek by Bibi Dumon Tak (2000). She also worked for a time as a children's book illustrator.

She wrote and drew La Jeune fille et le nègre, an autobiographical story in two volumes about the love between a young Togolese and a young Belgian. The narration depicts "the absurdity of the regularization procedures for undocumented migrants in Belgium", which multiply the obstacles facing this political refugee. The book, which mixes drama, humor, love, and lightness, according to Le Soir, immediately won several cultural prizes and was part of the selection for the Essentiels d'Angoulême in 2009, and for the Prix Tournesol. The storyline echoes a novel by Geert van Istendael, Bericht uit de burcht (News from the citadel), which expresses his dismay at his daughter's relationship with an undocumented man.

In 2012, Vanistendael published Toen David zijn stem verloor (David, women and death), whose hero is suffering from cancer and undertakes to change his life, without succeeding in protecting the women who are close to him from the effects of his agony:—"The disease is the tragedy of the patient, but also of those around him." The work, which is inspired by the death of Vanistendael's father-in-law, took two years to complete. Her preference was using watercolor. The work was one of the five finalists for the critics' grand prize. She has been nominated for the Eisner Award on three occasions.

Based on a screenplay by Mark Bellido, Vanistendael drew and colored Salto - L'Histoire du marchand de bonbons qui disparut sous la pluie (Salto - The Story of the Candy Merchant Who Disappeared in the Rain) (2016), which features a candy seller turned bodyguard in Spain of the 1990s. The main character, Miquel, is a failed writer who sells candy to support his family and agrees to become a bodyguard for a politician threatened by ETA, which ends up destroying his life. Vanistendael uses several processes and formats, in particular the colored pencil.

Vanistendael joined forces with Michael De Cock for a children's series, Rosie et Moussa, which appears in Dutch and as a serial in Brussel Deze Week before being the subject of four volumes. The story tells of the great friendship between two children from Brussels. The series was translated into many languages and received several awards. Director Dorothée Van Den Berghe was inspired by it to create the film Rosie et Moussa, released in theaters in October 2018.

In 2019, inspired by the character of Penelope in the Odyssey, Vanistendael delivers Les Deux Vies de Pénélope, where a doctor mother engages in humanitarian work and distances herself from her family, especially her daughter. Vanistendael opted for a treatment with "watercolor stains". Vanistendael long wanted to describe the life of a woman who, due to an intense job, cannot invest herself with her daughter. Having read the work of Homer, Vanistendael was struck by the role of Penelope, who limits herself to keeping the hearth, while her husband has increasing adventures. Nevertheless, Vanistendael retains that Odysseus left his family because a higher interest required it. In Vanistendael's album, Penelope's husband is responsible for watching over the home, while Penelope, haunted by her missions in countries at war, "refuses to let herself be reduced to her dimension as a mother" and returns to her humanitarian activities. During the production of the work, Vanistendael went to a refugee camp and drew a graphic report: Moria, the hell of Lesbos. For this work, she received the "Bulles d'Humanité" prize, awarded by the newspaper, L'Humanité.

In 2021, at the Prix Atomium, Vanistendael won the Prix Willy-Vandersteen with Zidrou for La Baleine-bibliothèque (Le Lombard).

== Personal life ==
Vanistendael has a daughter.

== Selected works ==
- La Jeune fille et le nègre (scriptwriter and designer), éd. Actes Sud - L'An 2
1. Papa et Sophie, April 2008 ISBN 978-2-7427-7330-5
2. Babette et Sophie, September 2009 ISBN 978-2-7427-7959-8
- David les femmes et la mort (scriptwriter, designer, and colorist), trans. Hélène Robbe, Le Lombard, January 2012 ISBN 978-2-8036-3024-0
- Salto - L'histoire du marchand de bonbons qui disparut sous la pluie (designer and colorist), scriptwriter by Mark Bellido, Le Lombard, June 2016 ISBN 978-2-8036-3384-5
- Rosie et Moussa, Bayard Jeunesse
1. La rencontre, January 2018
2. Une lettre de Papa, May 2018
- Les Deux Vies de Pénélope (scriptwriter), Le Lombard, September 2019 ISBN 978-2-8036-7225-7. Finalist, Prix de la critique, 2020

== Awards and honours ==
- 2021, Prix Atomium, winner Prix Willy-Vandersteen with Zidrou, for La Baleine-bibliothèque (Le Lombard)
- 2015, nominated, Deutscher Jugendliteraturpreis
- 2014, nominated, Eisner Award for Best Painter/Digital Artist
- 2014, nominated, Eisner Award for Best U.S. Edition of International Material
- 2013, nominated, Outstanding Graphic Novel, Ignatz Awards
- 2007, Best comic (Dutch language), Prix Saint-Michel: De Maagd en de Neger, papa en Sofie, Uitgeverij De Harmonie - Oog & Blik

== Bibliography ==
- "Judith Vanistendael", Le Soir, 29 January 2013.
- "Le crabe peut nous faire aimer la vie", Le Soir, 20 January 2012.
- "Repéré pour vous. Être humanitaire et maman", 24 heures, 11 September 2019.
- "Un choix que les autres n'acceptent pas", Metro, 4 September 2019.
- Beauvallet, Laurent, "Faire face au cancer", Ouest-France, 5 August 2012.
- Bessec, Alain, "Judith Vanistendael : La jeune fille et le nègre", Ouest-France, 8 June 2008.
- Blehache, Philippe, "Un jeu avec la mort", Sud Ouest, 19 June 2016.
- Boussin, O. "David les femmes et la mort", BD Gest' , 1 June 2012.
- Brunner, Vincent "BD : 'Les Deux Vies de Pénélope', mère et médecin humanitaire", Les Inrockuptibles, 13 September 2019.
- Couvreur, Daniel "La jeune fille et le nègre 2, Babette et Sophie", Le Soir, 25 September 2009.
- Couvreur, Daniel & Vanistendael, Judith (interview), "L’Odyssée, terriblement humaine", Le Soir, 14 September 2019.
- Dauphinais-Pelletier, Camille, "David, les femmes et la mort", La Nouvelle (Sherbrooke), 4 February 2015.
- Jarno, Stéphane, "Les Deux Vies de Pénélope, Judith Vanistendael", Télérama, 5 October 2019.
- Le Saux, Laurence, "BD : Judith Vanistendael tisse la toile d'une Pénélope moderne et aventureuse", Télérama, 10 September 2019.
- Le Saux, Laurence, "Salto" de Judith Vanistendael ou la double face d'un vendeur de bonbons", Télérama, 26 June 2016.
- Milette, J. "Salto", BD Gest' , 15 September 2016.
- O.V.V., "Les Deux Vies de Pénélope", Le Vif, 12 September 2019.
- P.V., "À bras-le-corps", Aujourd'hui en France, 30 June 2016.
- S.T., "Les deux vies de Pénélope", Moustique, 18 September 2019.
- Salin, S. "Les deux vies de Pénélope", BD Gest' , 5 September 2019.
- Servin, Lucie, "Les Deux Vies de Pénélope : Ulysse au foyer", Les Cahiers de la bande dessinée, no. 9, October–December 2019, p. 163.
- Van Vaerenbergh, Olivier "Derrière Pénélope: le journal de création de Judith Vanistendael", Le Vif, 17 September 2019.
- Van Vaerenbergh, Olivier, "Derrière Pénélope", Le Vif, 12 September 2019.
