= Benjamin Van Camp =

Belgian scientist

Benjamin Van Camp (born 26 December 1946) is a Belgian scientist working on the immunobiology of B cell malignancies and multiple myeloma, and autologous bone marrow transplantation. Between 2000 and 2008 he was the rector of the Vrije Universiteit Brussel.

Benjamin Van Camp was born in Mechelen, Belgium, in 1946. He graduated magna cum laude at the Vrije Universiteit Brussel in 1971, and earned his PhD degree in 1979. He spent several years working abroad at the University of California, San Diego, Stanford University and the University of Nebraska–Lincoln, and he worked with the IMF's chairman, Dr. Brian G.M. Durie, at both the University of Arizona and the University of London.

Currently, he is a professor of hematology and immunology at the Vrije Universiteit Brussel. He is also the head of the Blood Transfusion Center Jette and head of the Clinical Department of Medical Oncology and Hematology at the academic hospital UZBrussel.

Benjamin Van Camp has held numerous appointments including President of the Belgian Hematological Society and the Belgian Immunological Society, and he is currently President of the International Crythropoietim Advisory Board and a Scientific Advisor to the International Myeloma Foundation. He was knighted by King Albert II of Belgium in 2006 for his achievements in life sciences and in the Belgian academic world.
