= Luc Van der Kelen =

Belgian journalist (1948–2026)

- Van der Kelen in 2007
- Born: June 1948; Boom, Belgium
- Died: 10 March 2026 (aged 77)
- Education: Ghent University
- Occupation: Journalist

Luc Van der Kelen (June 1948 – 10 March 2026) was a Belgian journalist.

Van der Kelen studied at Ghent University, where he was a member and president of the Vlaamse Geschiedkundige Kring. In 1972, he joined De Nieuwe Gazet, where he served as editor-in-chief from 1991 to 1995.

Van der Kelen died on 10 March 2026, at the age of 77.
