= Hubert Detremmerie =

Belgian businessman

Hubert Detremmerie (26 March 1930; Deerlijk–9 November 2008; Ronse) was a Belgian businessman and banker. From 1955 until he retired in March 1995, he worked at BACOB Bank (now part of Belfius), the bank of the Belgian Catholic labor organisation, finally as chairman of its managing board. From 1995 until 2001, he served as a director of Lernout & Hauspie. He served as a member of the advisory board to the Belgian Ministry of Finance for Financial Institutions and Markets, the Council of Labor, the King Baudouin Foundation, and the Belgian National Counsel for the Cooperation Among Labor, Business and Government. He was a member of the Coudenberg group, a Belgian federalist think tank. Together with Wilfried Martens, Alfons Verplaetse, and Jef Houthuys, he met at Poupehan between 1982 and 1987 to discuss the social and economic situation of Belgium.

== Sources ==
- Social Europe after the Euro (The Hubert Detremmerie Seminar]
