= Frans Vanistendael =

Franciscus (Frans) Vanistendael (1942-2021) was a Belgian expert on tax law and former professor at the Katholieke Universiteit Leuven (KUL) and the Brussels Tax College (HUBrussel). Until 2005 he was dean of the law school of the KU Leuven. He was a member of the Coudenberg group, a Belgian federalist think tank. Frans Vanistendael is a brother of the writer Geert van Istendael.

== Education ==
He graduated in law and notariat at the Katholieke Universiteit Leuven and obtained a PhD in law at the KUL. He obtained a LL.M. at Yale University (United States).

== Career ==
He was a member of the Brussels bar. During his career he was a visiting professor at Kansai University (Osaka), Monash University (Melbourne) and the University of Sydney (Sydney). From 1986 until 1987 he was Royal Commissioner for Tax Reform and from 1980 until 1982 he was cabinet advisor to the Minister of Finance. From 1980 until 2000, he was a member of the Belgian High Council of Finance. From 1989 until 1997, he was Director of the Centre for Advanced Legal Studies and from 1995 until 1997, he was the first and founding president of the European Law Faculties Association.

In addition to his role in Belgian tax law, he was an expert for the European Commission on the harmonisation of tax law in Europe and a consultant with the International Monetary Fund (IMF) and the Organisation for Economic Co-operation and Development (OECD).

== Sources ==
- Frans Vanistendael
- Seventeenth-Tax-Conference (people)
