= University of Antwerp =

University in Antwerp, Belgium

Coordinates: 51°13′22″N 04°24′36″E

- Universiteit Antwerpen
- Type: Public
- Established: 2003; 23 years ago 1973 (confederation); 1852 (Institut Saint-Ignace)
- Affiliations: Utrecht Network, AACSB, EFDM, NVAO, YUFE, UASR
- Rector: Herwig Leirs
- Academic staff: ▲6,205
- Students: ▲21,133
- Doctoral students: 1,939
- Location: Antwerp, Antwerp Province, Flanders, Belgium
- Campus: City Campus Campus Mutsaard Campus Paardenmarkt Campus Drie Eiken Campus Middelheim Campus Groenenborger
- Colours: UAntwerp red and UAntwerp blue
- Nickname: UA
- Website: www.uantwerpen.be/en/

The University of Antwerp (Dutch: Universiteit Antwerpen) is a major Belgian university located in the city of Antwerp. The official abbreviation is UAntwerp. The University of Antwerp has about 20,000 students, which makes it the third-largest university in Flanders. The University of Antwerp is characterised by its high standards in education, internationally competitive research and entrepreneurial approach. It was founded in 2003 after the merger of three smaller universities.

== History ==
=== Origins ===
The university's roots go back to Sint-Ignatius Handelshogeschool (Saint-Ignatius College of Commerce) founded by the Jesuits (Society of Jesus) in Antwerp in 1852. This was one of the first European business schools to offer formal university degrees. It later opened a Faculty of Literature and Philosophy (including Law) and a Faculty of Political and Social Sciences. It was renamed Universitaire Faculteiten Sint-Ignatius Antwerpen (UFSIA) in the 1960s when the Belgian government granted it university status. In the early 1970s UFSIA joined into a confederation with "Rijksuniversitair Centrum Antwerpen" (RUCA) and "Universitaire Instelling Antwerpen" (UIA), public institutions.

=== Merger ===
In 2003 UFSIA, RUCA, and UIA merged into the University of Antwerp to become the first explicitly pluralistic university in Belgium, offering philosophical, ethical, and spiritual discourse and openness towards religion and intercultural dialogue. It soon became the third largest university in Flanders with 20,000 students. In order to face the challenges posed by the internationalization of European education and research, the university is part of the Antwerp University Association (AUHA). The Catholic influence that the Jesuits had at UFSIA continues through the Saint Ignatius University Centre (UCSIA), Antwerp, founded in 2003.

In September 2020, the University of Antwerp chose to start the new academic year with stricter coronavirus measures than those recommended by the government.

== Faculties ==
The University of Antwerp has 34 academic bachelor programmes, 83 master programmes, 26 master-after-master programmes and 21 postgraduates. In addition, there are 26 programmes completely taught in English (1 bachelor, 16 master, 6 master-after-master and 3 postgraduate programmes). All of these programmes are divided into 9 faculties.

- Business and Economics
- Pharmaceutical, Veterinary and Biomedical Sciences
- Medicine and Health Sciences
- Arts
- Design Sciences (including architecture and conservation)
- Social Sciences
- Law
- Applied Engineering Sciences
- Science

The Institute of Development Policy and Management (IOB) has an autonomous faculty-like UAntwerp status and Antwerp Management School is an autonomous school within the University of Antwerp.

== Campuses ==
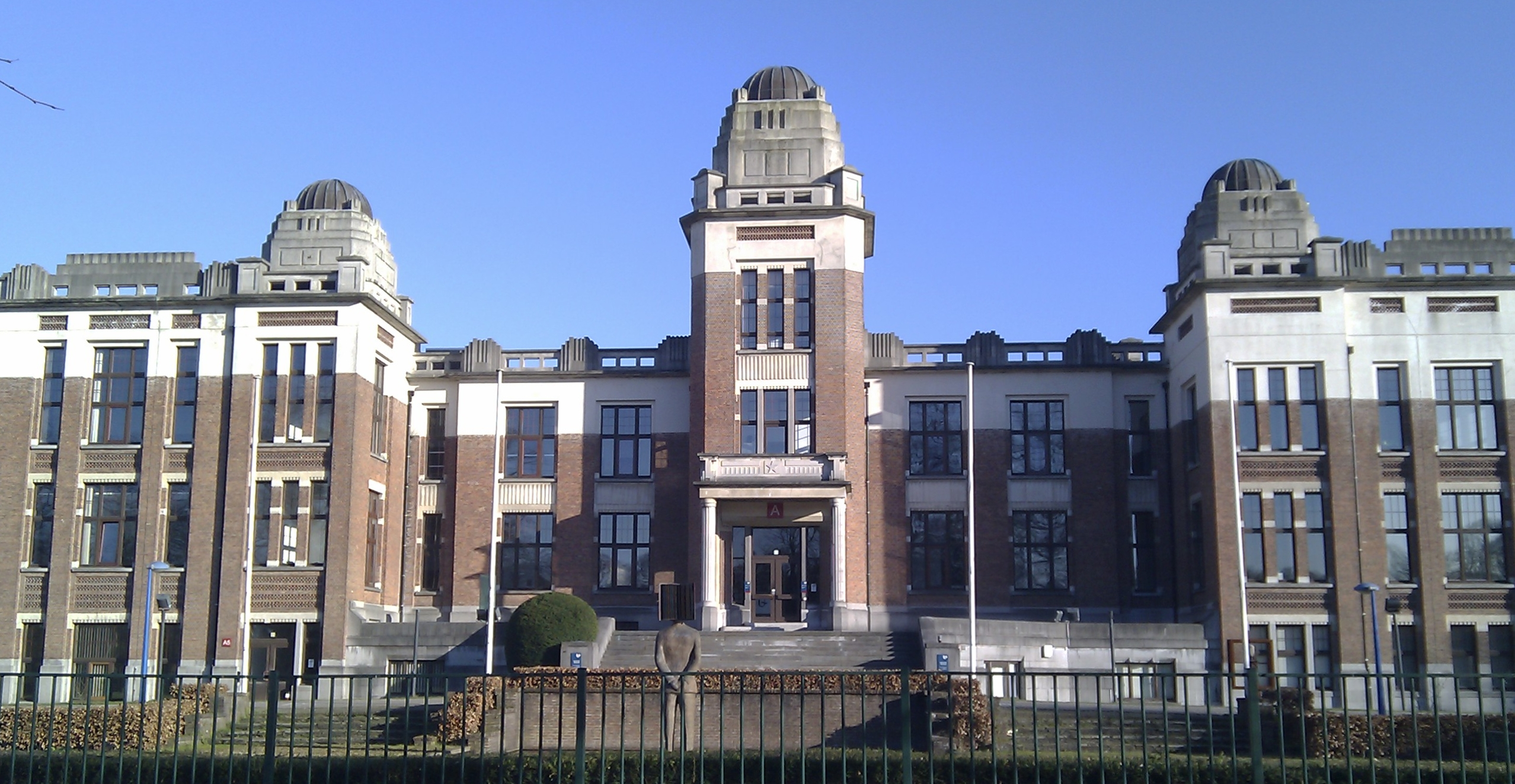
Campus Middelheim building A

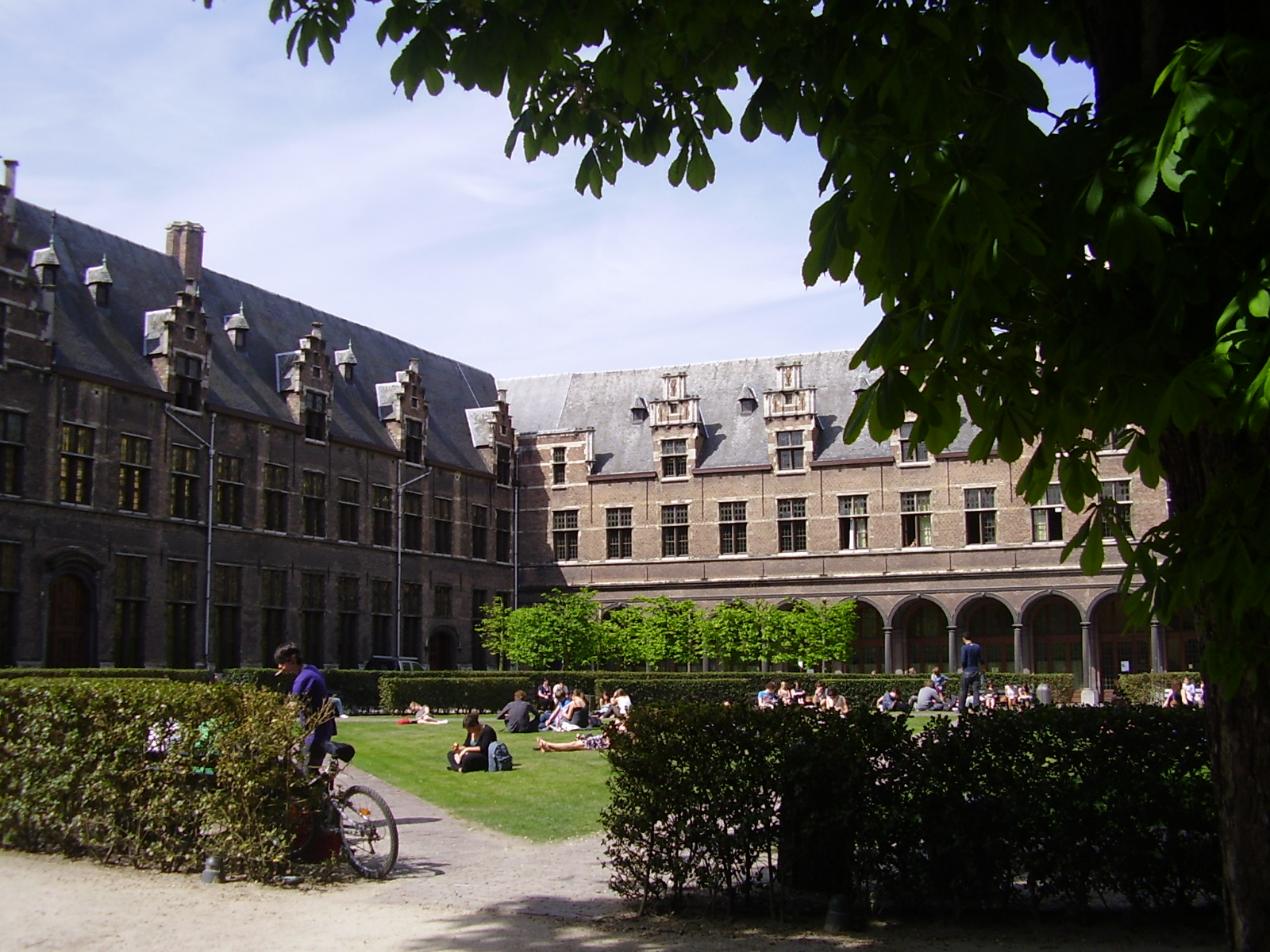
The large quad of the Stadscampus

The six campuses are located all over the city of Antwerp, from the historic city centre to the green belt to the south of the city.

- Stadscampus: Prinsstraat 13, 2000 Antwerpen
- Campus Mutsaard: Mutsaardstraat 31, 2000 Antwerpen
- Campus Paardenmarkt: Paardenmarkt 92, 2000 Antwerpen
- Campus Drie Eiken: Universiteitsplein 1, 2610 Wilrijk (Antwerpen)
- Campus Middelheim: Middelheimlaan 1, 2020 Antwerpen
- Campus Groenenborger: Groenenborgerlaan 171, 2020 Antwerpen

== Academic ranking ==
University rankings

Global – Overall
- ARWU World: 201–300 (2022)
- CWUR World: 293 (2022–23)
- CWTS World: 400 (2022)
- QS World: 280 (2026)
- QS Under 50: 20 (2021)
- THE World: =131 (2023)
- THE Young Universities: 7 (2022)
- USNWR Global: =223 (2022–23)

In the 2010 QS World University Rankings the University of Antwerp was ranked 179th overall in the world. On the 2009 THE–QS World University Rankings list (in 2010 Times Higher Education World University Rankings and QS World University Rankings parted ways to produce separate rankings), University of Antwerp was ranked on a shared 177th place. An overview of the THE-QS World University Rankings up to 2011:

Year	Rank (Change)
2005	235
2006	252 (▼17)
2007	187 (▲65)
2008	195 (▼8)
2009	177 (▲18)
2010	179 (▼2)
2011	197 (▼18)

Times Higher Education World University Ranking:

Year	Rank (Change)
2011–2012	276–300
2012–2013	192 (▲84–108)
2013–2014	164 (▲28)
2014–2015	170 (▼6)
2015–2016	190 (▼20)
2016–2017	201–250 (▼11–60)
2017–2018	201–250
2018–2019	201–250
2019–2020	198 (▲3–52)
2020–2021	170 (▲28)
2021–2022	143 (▲27)
2022–2023	131 (▲12)

== Notable alumni ==
=== Economics ===
- Marcia De Wachter (1953–), director of the National Bank of Belgium
- Patrick Janssens (1956–), politician (Flemish MP, former mayor of Antwerp)
- Mimi Lamote (1964–), CEO Mayerline
- Philippe Muyters (1961–), politician (Flemish minister)
- Yuri Bobbert (1973-), cybersecurity executive, academic, and entrepreneur

=== History ===
- Bart De Wever, (1970-), politician (prime minister of Belgium (2025–present), representative, floor leader New Flemish Alliance party and mayor of Antwerp)
- Marie-Rose Morel, politician

=== Law ===
- Gerolf Annemans (1958–), politician (representative, floor leader Vlaams Belang party)
- Peter Van Den Bossche (1959-), professor and member of the WTO Appellate Body
- Cathy Berx (1969–), jurist and politician (governor of the province of Antwerp)
- Jan Grauls (1948–), diplomat (ambassador)
- Mieke Offeciers-Van De Wiele (1952–), politician (former minister)
- Kris Peeters (1962–), politician (Minister-President of Flanders)
- Herman Portocarero (1952–), author and diplomat
- Matthias Storme (1959–), lawyer and politician
- Rudi Thomaes (1952–2018), former CEO of the Federation of Belgian Enterprises
- Bruno Valkeniers, businessman and politician (party leader of Vlaams Belang)
- Staf Van Reet, businessman

=== Medicine ===
- Paul Stoffels (1962–), cofounder of Tibotec and Virco
- Manto Tshabalala-Msimang (1940–2009), South African politician

=== Linguistics and Literature & Philosophy ===
- Clara Cleymans (1989–), actress, voice actress and musical theatre singer
- Jan Huyghebaert (1945–), banker
- Jan Leyers (1958–), author, musician and presenter
- Hugo Matthysen (1956–), author, musician and presenter
- Bart Peeters (1959–), musician and presenter
- Matthias Storme (1959–), lawyer and politician

=== Political and Social Sciences ===
- Jos Geysels, former politician and chairman 11.11.11
- Patrick Janssens (1956–), politician (Flemish MP, mayor of Antwerp)
- Marthe Wandou (1963–), Cameroonian activist
- Peter Mertens (1969–), politician
- Lieven Janssens (1977–), politician (former mayor of Vorselaar)
- Johan Vande Lanotte (1955–), politician (minister, MP, senator)
- Johan Van Hecke (1954–), member of the European Parliament
- Sam van Rooy (born1985), Belgian politician for Vlaams Belang, author, blogger, and former professional cyclist
- Mieke Vogels (1954–), politician (former minister, Flemish MP)

=== Sciences ===
- Dries Buytaert (1978–), author of Drupal
- Didier de Chaffoy de Courcelles (1953–), vice-president R&D of Janssen Pharmaceutica
- Peter Piot (1949–), microbiologist, head of UNAIDS
- Vincent Timmerman, molecular biologist
- Christine Van Broeckhoven (1953–), scientist and politician
- Rosa Rademakers (1978-), neurobiologist
- Anthony Liekens (1975–), informaticists, biologist, inventor and educator

== Notable faculty ==
- Marc Bossuyt, law
- Fernand Deschamps (1868–1957), philosophy
- Rudy Martens, management
- Bence Nanay, philosophy
- Christine Van Broeckhoven, molecular biologist
- Christine Van Den Wyngaert, law
- Frank Vandenbroucke, Applied Economics and Social Sciences
- Hans Vangheluwe, computer science

== Student life ==
=== Sports ===
The University of Antwerp has a long tradition in organizing international student championships. The following FISU, EUSA and IFIUS events have been organized:

- 1978: FISU World University Cycling Championship
- 1982: FISU World University Cross Country Championship
- 1992: FISU World University Chess Championship
- 2004: IFIUS World Interuniversity Games
- 2006: FISU World University Cycling Championship
- 2007: EUSA European University Bridge Championship

=== Student organisations ===
At the University of Antwerp there are faculty clubs, regional clubs and political clubs. Faculty bound clubs are governed by VUAS which consists of Unifac and ASK-Stuwer. Political and philosophical clubs are governed by PFK-Antwerpen. The student newspaper is called "Dwars".

== See also ==
- Antwerp Management School
- Fastra II
- Flanders Interuniversity Institute of Biotechnology (Vlaams Instituut voor Biotechnologie, VIB)
- Interuniversity Microelectronics Centre (IMEC)
- Performance Analysis of Telecommunication Systems – a telecommunications research group at the university
- Institute of Tropical Medicine Antwerp
- Science and technology in Flanders
- University Foundation
- Utrecht Network
- Waterfront Researchpark
