= Dutch and Flemish authors banquet at Deerlijk in 1933 =

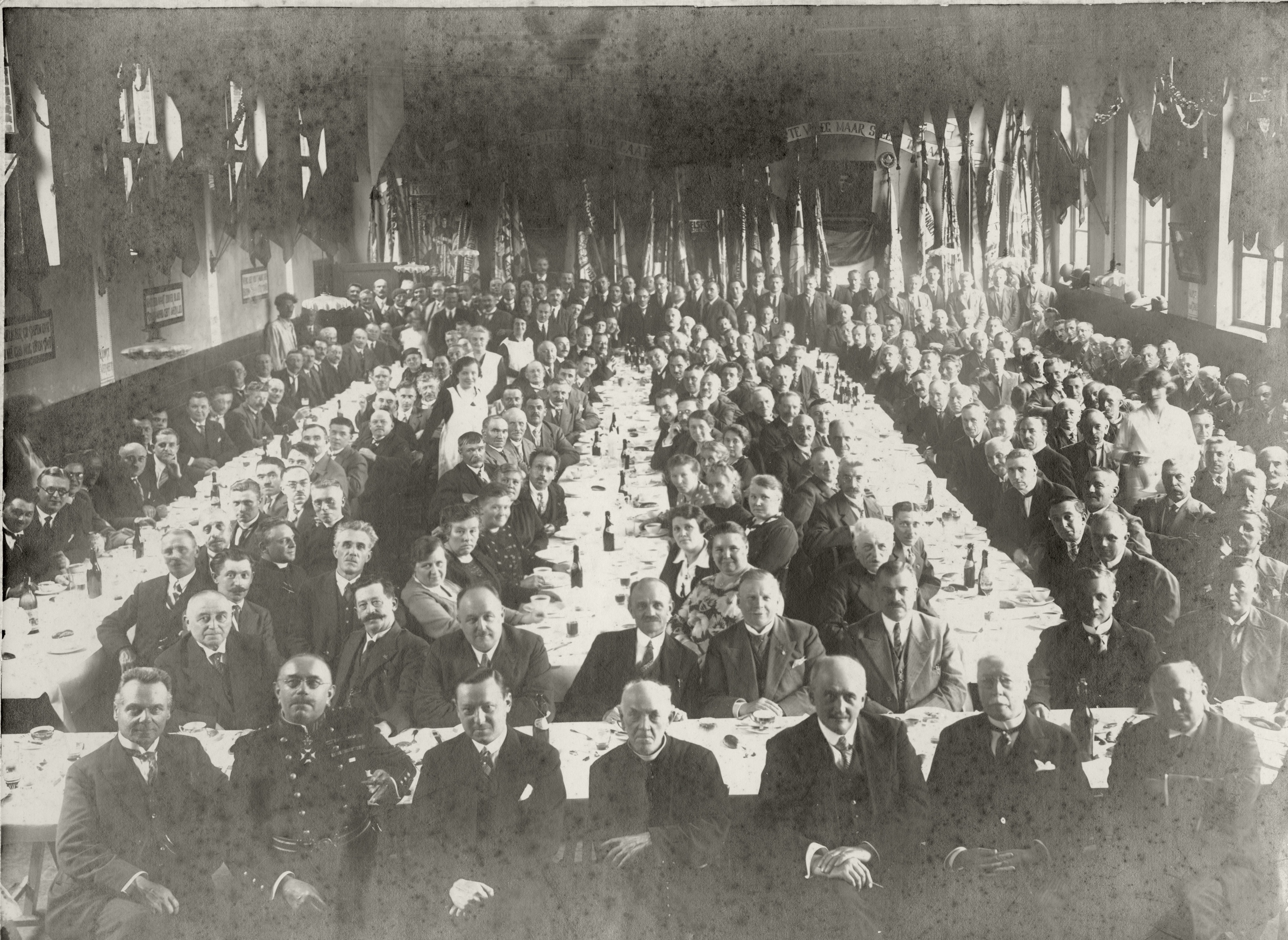
Photo taken at the banquet of the literary event on August 26, 1933 in Deerlijk.

The Dutch and Flemish authors' banquet, was a literary event on August 26, 1933, held at Deerlijk in Belgium, attended by the prominent writers in Belgium and the Netherlands of that era. It was held on the same day as a celebration of the anniversary of the Association of Large and Young Families (in Dutch: Bond van Grote en Jonge Gezinnen) of Deerlijk. The photo of the event is memorable because it shows an entire generation of Dutch and Flemish writers in one frame. Willem Elsschot met Jan Greshoff at the event, who convinced him to go back to writing, and the album 'Kaas' resulted. Also remarkable is that August Defresne and his secret mistress Anna Charlotte Ruys were present at the event.

== Attendees ==
Among the many attendees, the following persons can be identified.

- Baron Leon Antoine Bekaert (1891-1961), Belgian entrepreneur.
- Baron Leon Leander Bekaert (1855-1936), Belgian bibliophile and occasional writer, founder of a steel company in Zwevegem, and father of the above. He was a distant cousin of the next.
- Ernest Constant Declercq (1872-1947), Belgian bibliophile and occasional writer, farmer and flax merchant, great-grandfather of Nico F. Declercq and Françoise Vanhecke, fostering guardian of Gabriëlle Demedts and André Demedts, and father of their close friends Michel Declercq and Valentine Declercq. Gabriëlle Demedts wrote the poem “Ik heb gedaan…” (I am done…) when Ernest Constant Declercq died in 1947 and she wrote '’Rustig lied’' (quiet song), '’Lage tonen'’ (low vibes) and '’Zomer’' (Summer) about Valentine Declercq. Gabriëlle and André Demedts spent much of their youth with the children of Ernest Constant in Wielsbeke and with his sister Flavie Marie Louise Declercq in Ghent.
- Leon Defraeye (1899-1977), Belgian entrepreneur, author and local historian at Deerlijk.
- Hector Deprez (1873-1939), a general in the Belgian military.
- August Defresne (1893-1961), Dutch writer. In 1933, he had an affair with Anna Charlotte Ruys, who was also at the banquet in Deerlijk. The couple married in 1945. In 1933 Defresne wrote the story 'De vrome speelman' (The pious womanizer), about a playmate who left earthly life, women, and bars behind and devoted himself entirely to God.
- Maurits Demedts, farmer and father of André Demedts and Gabriëlle Demedts.
- Willem Elsschot (1882-1960). He was a Flemish author, perhaps most well-known for his work ‘Kaas’ (Cheese) which is attributed to his return to work after meeting Menno ter Braak and Jan Greshoff in 1933. Elsschot and Greshoff were both at the 1933 banquet in Deerlijk.
- Marnix Gijsen (1899-1984) was a Flemish writer. When the banquet occurred, he was the director of Antwerp's Fine Arts and Propaganda department. The year after the event in Deerlijk, he was promoted to chief of staff of Camille Huysmans (1871-1968) in the Ministry of Industry, Self-Employed and Domestic Trade.
- Jan Greshoff (1888-1971) was a Dutch journalist, poet, and literary critic.
- Henriette Roland Holst (1869-1952) was a Dutch socialist and a poet. In 1934 her poetic work 'Tusschen tijd en eeuwigheid' (Between time and eternity) was published, showing passages inspired by her visit to Deerlijk in 1933.
- Georges Ista (1874-1939) was a Belgian author who wrote in French and is known for his theatre works and cartoons. He lived in Paris most of his life.
- Karel Lateur (1873-1949) was a Flemish sculptor and brother of Stijn Streuvels.
- Count Maurice Lippens (1875-1956) was a Belgian liberal politician and diplomat.
- Marcel Matthijs (1899-1964) was a Flemish writer, who wrote poems and novels. His work 'Een spook op zolder' (A ghost in the attic), which he published in 1938, was adopted by the then-wife, Charlotte Köhler (1892-1977), of August Defresne into the play 'filomeentje'. In 1933, August Defrensne attended the banquet with his mistress Anna Charlotte Ruys.
- Pierre Henri Ritter (1882-1962), known as P.H. Ritter jr., was a Dutch civil servant, literary scientist, writer, journalist, critic, and radio presenter.
- Anna Charlotte Ruys (1898-1977) was a Dutch bacteriologist. In 1933, she was the secret mistress of August Defresne, equally present at the banquet, and in 1940, she became a professor in bacteriology, epidemiology, and immunology at the University of Amsterdam. The couple married in 1945.
- Stijn Streuvels (1871-1969) was a Flemish writer.
- Anton van Duinkerken (1903-1968) was a Dutch poet, a literary historian and professor. In 1933, the year of the banquet in Deerlijk, he received the prize ‘C.W. van der Hoogtprijs’ for his work 'Dichters der contra-Reformatie' (Poets of the contra-reformation).
- Arthur van Schendel (1874-1946) was a Dutch writer who, in 1933, won the Tollens Prize for his entire work.
- Edward Vermeulen (1861-1934) was a Flemish writer who wrote under the pseudonym ‘Warden Oom.’ He is known for his weekly articles in newspapers and for a book about his time as a refugee during World War I.

== Photo Legend ==
Legend of the 1933 banquet photo

Fifty persons, including the authors mentioned above, are identified in the picture and are listed in a numbered legend: (1) Leo Leander Bekaert, (2) Leon Antoine Bekaert, (3) Hector Deprez, (4) Joseph Devos, (5) Hector Isebaert, (6) Ernest Constant Declercq, (7) A. Decock, (8) Marcel Deleersnyder, (9) Edward Vermeulen, (10) Philip Monbaliu, (11) Amand De Meester, (12) H. Depraetere, (13) Jules De Haene, (14) Joseph Coussement, (15) Julien Allegaert, (16) Gerard Hemeryck, (17) Remi Devos, (18) Mauritz Demedts, (19) Camiel Ryckebosch, (20) Joseph Lemayeur, (21) Claus, (22) Gentiel Vandendriessche, (23) Gentiel Coorevits, (24) René Vandekerckhove, (25) Leon Defraeye, (26) Alois Vandendriessche, (27) Georges Ista, (28) Gustaaf Steelandt, (29) Leon Bossuyt, (30) Cyrille Depla, (31) Edmond Vanneste, (32) Remi Vanderschelden, (33) Gentiel Vermoere, (34) Willem Elsschot, (35) Karel Lateur, (36) Paul Lesage, (37) Marcel Matthijs, (38) Henriette Roland Holst, (39) Marnix Gijsen, (40) Elisa Vermeulen, (41) Willem Jan Marie Anton Asselbergs, (42) Joseph Ziller, (43) Stijn Streuvels, (44) Jan Greshoff, (45) Arthur van Schendel, (46) Maurice Auguste Eugène Charles Marie Ghislain Lippens, (47) Anna Charlotte Ruys, (48) August Defresne, (49) Pierre Henri Ritter, (50) Lea or Leona Delombaerde.
