= Anna Charlotte Ruys =

Dutch bacteriologist

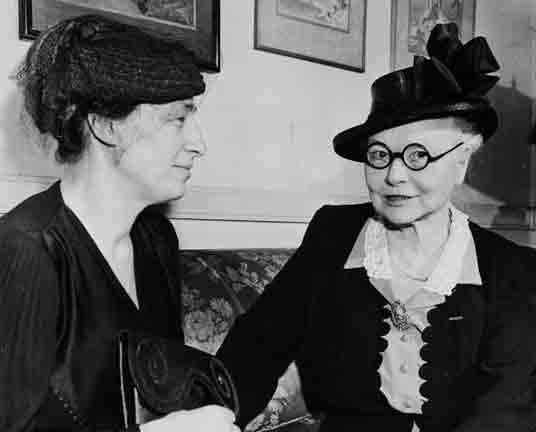
- Ruys as chairman (left) speaking to the former chairman of the Medical Women's International Association Dr. Esther P. Lovjoy in 1948
- Born: 21 December 1898; Dedemsvaart
- Died: 8 February 1977 (aged 78); Amsterdam

Anna Charlotte Ruys or Charlotte Defresne-Ruys (1898 – 1977) was a Dutch professor of bacteriology and epidemiology. She became a proponent of hygiene in public health and an activist against biological warfare.

== Early life and education ==
Ruys was born in Dedemsvaart as a daughter of Bonne Ruys and Engelina Gijsberta Fledderus. Her younger sister, Mien, became a landscape architect and carried on their father's work.

Ruys studied at the Gymnasium in Zwolle and then was awarded a bachelor's degree in Utrecht. She pursued a PhD in medicine at Groningen, graduating on 3 July 1925 after submitting a thesis on the cause of rat-bite fever.

== Career ==
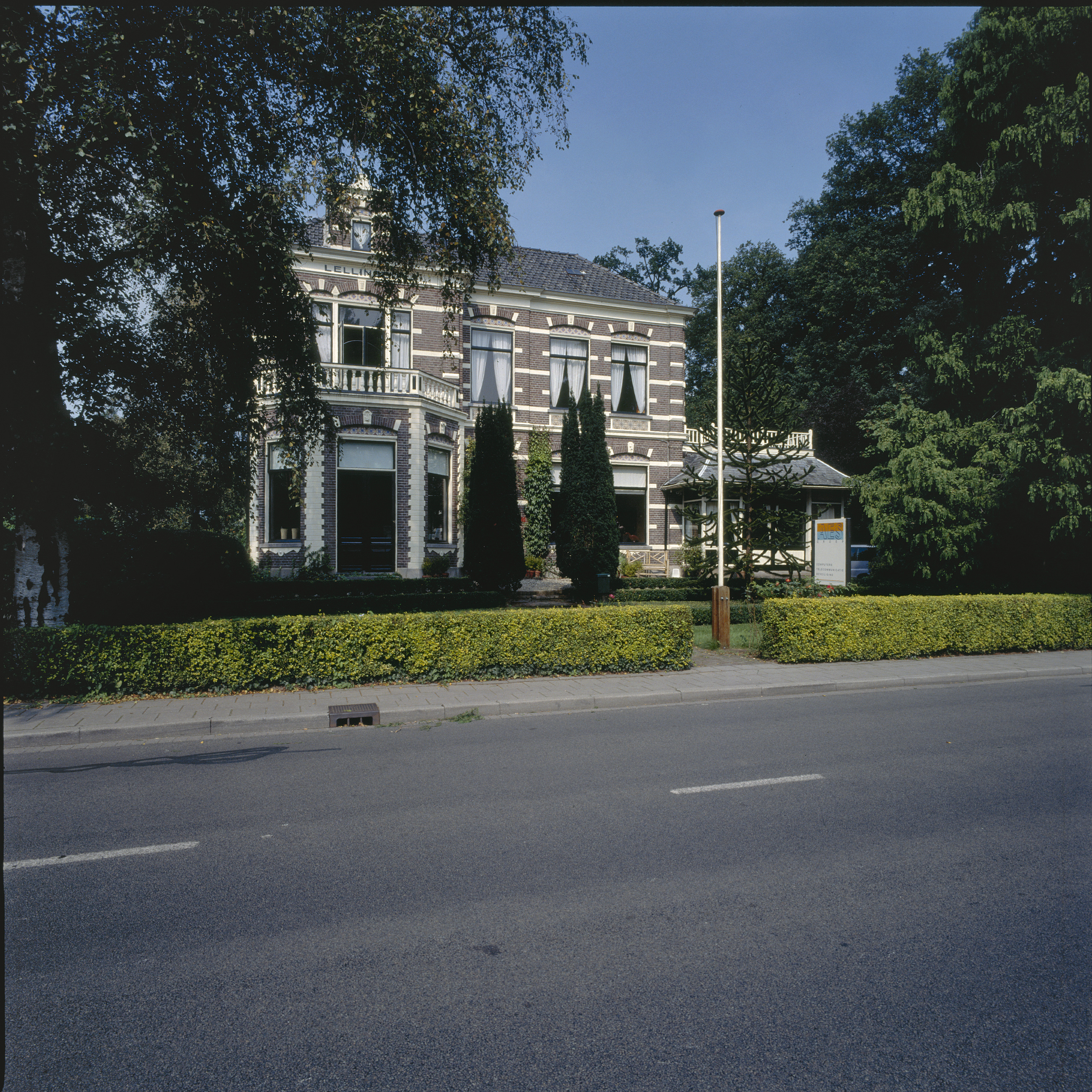
House formerly owned by Ruys in Dedemsvaart

She was hired by plague specialist Professor J. J. van Loghem to work on a study of plague in ship- and harbour-rats for the ministry of health (GG and GD). In 1928 she became director of the laboratories of the GG and GD and formed a class on hygiene which she then taught. One of her early discoveries was a large group of women who were being treated for gonorrhea despite actually suffering from the minor infection vulvovaginitis, due to sloppy laboratory tests. Proper diagnosis enabled the women to return to work and avoid the embarrassment and social stigma of a sexually transmitted infection. In 1940 she was promoted by van Loghem to professor of microbiology of infectious diseases in Amsterdam with the speech Ziektekiemen. The next year she spoke at an event celebrating his 25th anniversary as professor and in 1948 she took over his professorship of bacteriology, epidemiology and immunology. During the war years she participated in the artsenverzet (doctors' resistance). After male students were removed forcibly from one of her classes, she refused to teach until she was fired in 1944. In February 1945 she was arrested on suspicion of hiding illegal radio transmitters and was locked in the Oranjehotel until 6 May 1945. After her release she married her long-time lover, the playwright August Defresne on 22 June 1945. He had not been able to marry her before because his first wife would not grant him a divorce, and after 1934, she could not marry him because she would have to give up her work at the GG and GD due to the Algemeen Rijksambtenarenreglement (ARAR) law of 1934 that stated a female government employee younger than 45 who married would be honorably discharged on the day of her wedding. The couple can, for instance, be found together at an event in Deerlijk (Belgium) in 1933. Their relationship still needed to remain a secret, because co-habitation was considered the same as marriage under the ARAR.

From 1937-1950 she was chairman of the Medical Women's International Association. From 1947-1951 she was on the Dutch National UNESCO committee. During a trip to the USA she was involved in discussions about biological warfare, to which she was opposed. From 1949-1953 she was chairman of the medical faculty. She refused a request by the ministry of war to build a biological warfare laboratory and spoke out about it in February 1958.

Ruys died in Amsterdam.

== Works ==
Publications by Ruys include:

- De verwekker der rattenbeetziekten, PhD thesis, 1925
- Wisselende opvatting over besmetting, 1928
- De hygiëne van voeding, woning en kleeding, 1934
- Ziektekiemen, 1940
- Prof. dr. J.J. van Loghem, 1916-1941 : 25th Anniversary of the inauguration of van Loghem as a professor at the University of Amsterdam, 1941
- Bacteriological and Epidemiological Data on Typhoid Fever in Amsterdam, 1948
- The Diphtheria Epidemic in Amsterdam, 1949
- Human, rights : the task before us. Les droits de l'homme : notre tache, 1951
- Ali-esterase inhibitors and growth, 1953
- Leerboek Microbiologie en Immunologie - Voor artsen en studenten in de geneeskunde., editor, 8 volume textbook, Uitg. N.V.A. Oosthoek, 1950 (2nd edition 1953)
- Keerzijden van vooruitgang, 1959
- Verzet van vandaag, speech at awards ceremony on 18 February 1956 for two yearly prizes given by the Stichting Kunstenaarsverzet 1942-1945, Stedelijk Museum Amsterdam, (bundel of speeches published in 1961)
- The medical profession, 1968
