= George Friedrich Ferdinand Schiller =

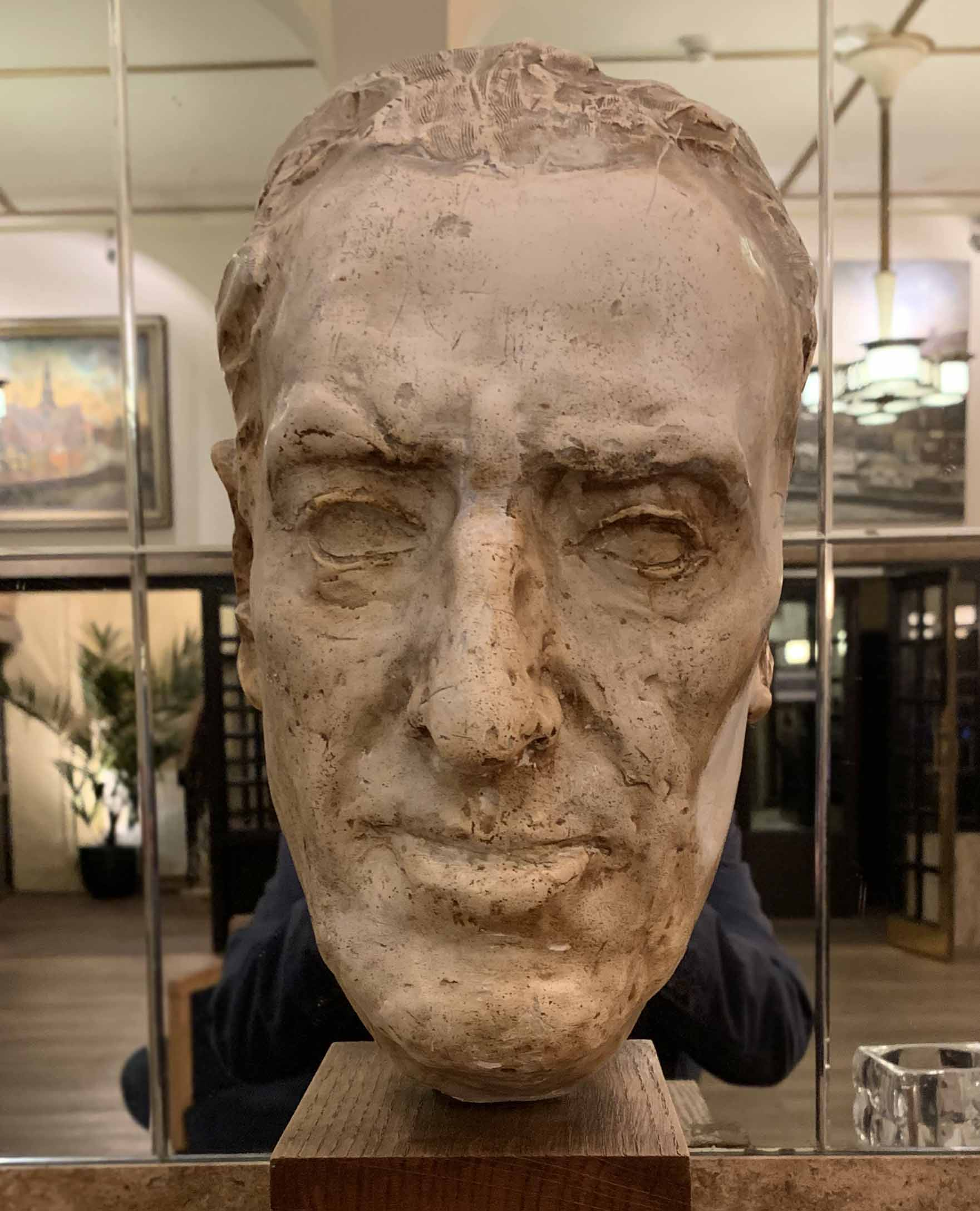
- Bust of Fritz Schiller
- Born: 1886; Netherlands
- Died: 1971 (aged 84–85)
- Occupations: Painter, Hotellier

Frits Schiller (born George Friedrich Ferdinand Schiller; 1886–1971) was a Dutch painter and hotelier, best known for founding the Schiller Hotel in Amsterdam and for his contributions to the city's cultural scene during the early 20th century. A large part of his collection of paintings continues to hang in the Schiller Hotel on Rembrandtplein in Amsterdam.

== Early life and education ==
Schiller was born in 1886 in the Netherlands. He was the son of George Schiller, a successful brewer and proprietor of an establishment on Rembrandtplein in Amsterdam. Frits pursued artistic training, studying under notable artists of the time.

== Artistic career ==
Schiller was an accomplished painter, with a body of work that included oil paintings and watercolours. He studied painting in Amsterdam, inspired by the Impressionists. His artworks often depicted scenes from Dutch life and landscapes. In the course of his life Schiller painted around 600 paintings, many of which hang today in the Schiller Hotel.

== Schiller Hotel ==
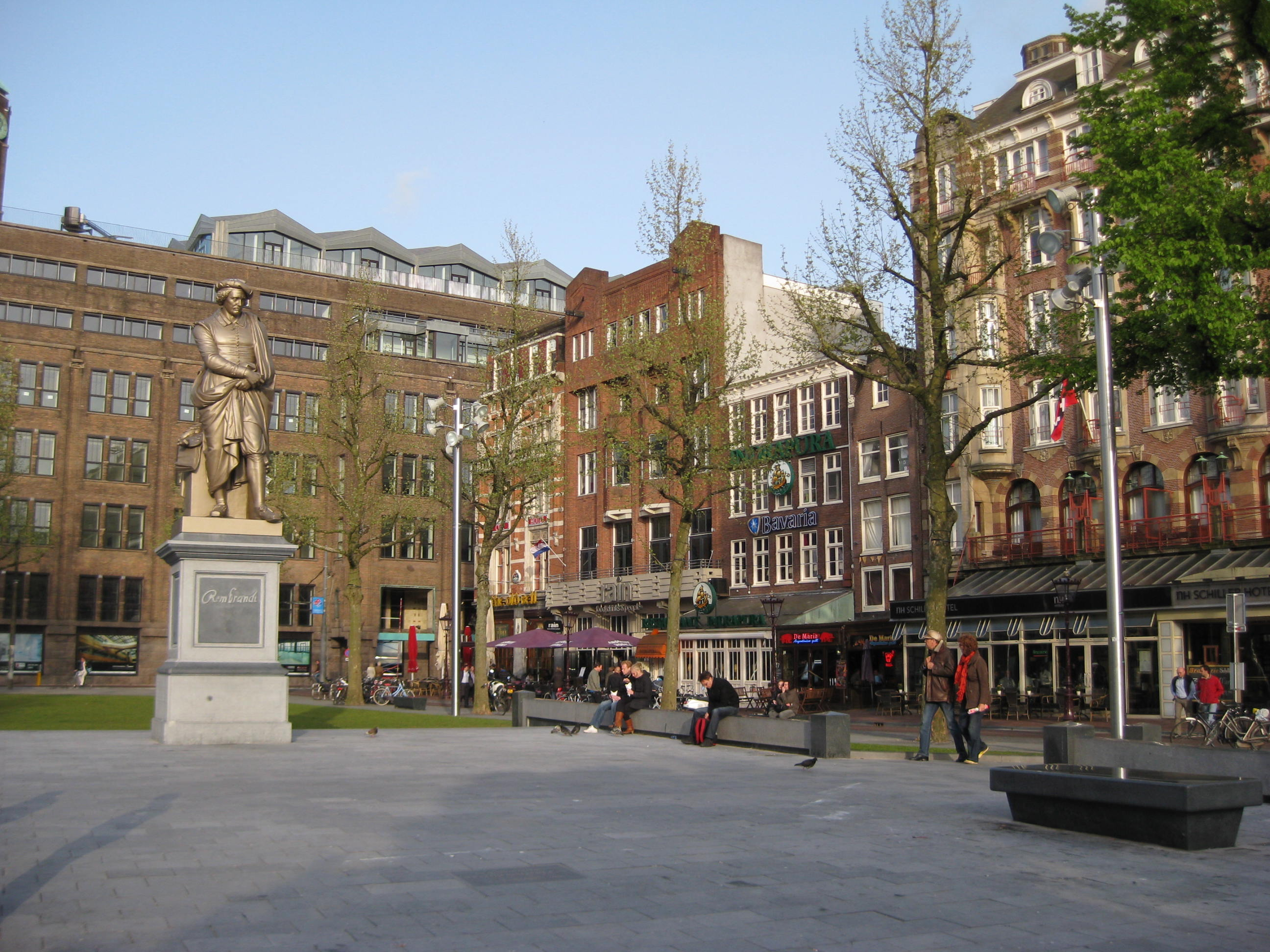
Rembrandtplein, Schiller Hotel on right

In 1912, Schiller, along with his siblings Hein and Elsa, commissioned the construction of a new hotel on Rembrandtplein. The Schiller Hotel officially opened its doors in 1913. The hotel quickly became a hub for artists, writers, and intellectuals, earning a reputation as Amsterdam's version of New York's Algonquin Hotel, frequented by writers such as Herman Heijermans, Jan Jacob Slauerhoff and Jan Greshoff, and painters such as George Hendrik Breitner, who lived for a time at the hotel. Despite many renovations, the hotel retains much of its art deco architectural heritage, especially the hotel bar.

== Legacy ==
Schiller died in 1971. His legacy endures through the Schiller Hotel, which continues to operate under the Spanish NH Hotels brand, and which continues to hang hundreds of his paintings.
