= UNIAPAC =

Organisation of Christian business leaders

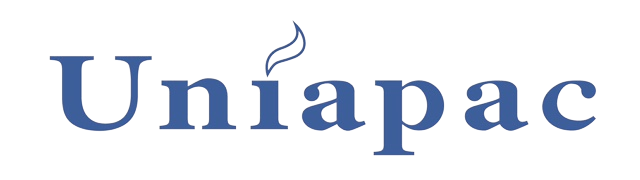

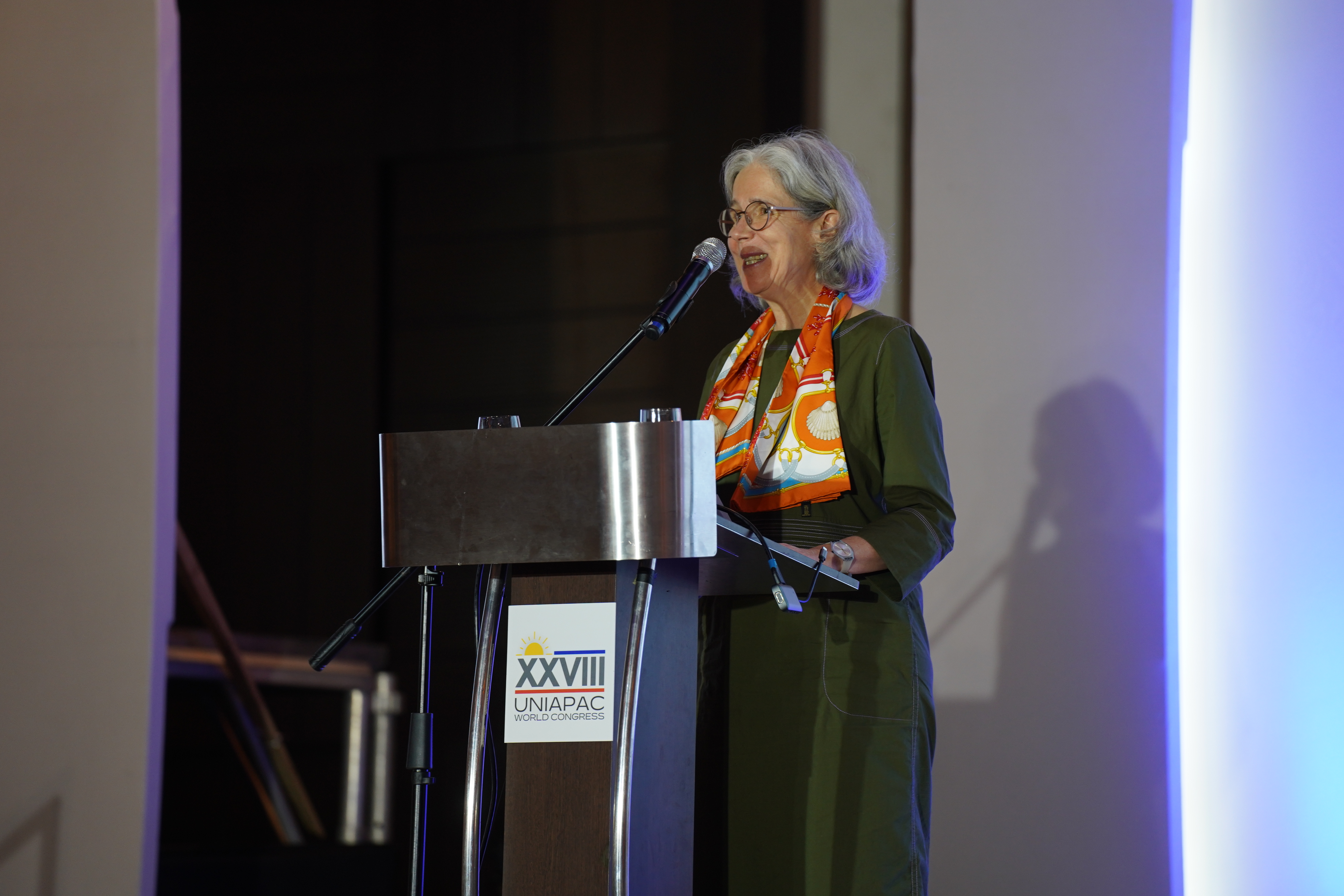

GENERAL INFORMATION
- Creation: 1931
- Head Office: Paris
- President: Sigrid Marz
- Secretary General: Rodrigo Whitelaw
- Website: uniapac.org

UNIAPAC (International Christian Union of Business Executives) is an ecumenical organisation of Christian business leaders that federates associations from 38 countries in Europe, Latin America, Africa and Asia, and recently North America, representing more than 45.000 business executives around the world. Inspired by the Catholic Social Teaching, the goal of UNIAPAC is to promote amongst business leaders the vision and implementation of an economy serving the human person and the common good.

== History of UNIAPAC ==
The predecessors of the organisation were national federations of Catholic employers in The Netherlands in 1915, Belgium in 1921 and France in 1926. In 1931, a group of Catholic employers created an International Comité d'Initiative at the 40th anniversary of the encyclical Rerum novarum in Rome. In addition, they took the initiative to organise regularly the Internationales des Associations Patronales Catholiques. UNIAPAC was founded in Rome in 1931 as the International Conferences of Catholic Employers by the organisations of Catholic entrepreneurs from France, Belgium and The Netherlands and also observers from Italy, Germany and Czechoslovakia.

In 1946, under General Secretary A.H.M. Albregst, UNIAPAC was established as the Union Internationale des Associations Patronales Catholiques. In 1948, UNIAPAC expanded to Latin America, starting in Chile. In 1958, a permanent international secretariat was created in Brussels with the support of Léon Bekaert (Belgium) and Peter H. Werhahn (Germany). In 1975, the first edition of the UNIAPAC World Congress was launched, as the “Churches-Transnational Corporations” Dialogue in Europe. The origin of these dialogues was the development of a consciousness, on the part of business and the Churches, on the role of business in society. In 1991, UNIAPAC commemorated in Rome the centenary of “Rerum Novarum” and presented to His Holiness John-Paul II the book “The Churches facing the enterprise – A Hundred Years of Social Thinking”.

Today, the head office of UNIAPAC is established in Paris, with Rodrigo Whitelaw as the Secretary General.

== List of presidents from 1956 to 2024 ==
- 1956-1959: Giuseppe Mosca (Italy)
- 1960-1964: Peter H. Werhahn (Germany)
- 1965-1968: Léon de Rosen (France)
- 1969-1972: Reinier A.H.M. Dobbelmann (The Netherlands)
- 1973-1976: Romuald Burkard (Switzerland)
- 1977-1981: Carlos E. Dietl (Argentina)
- 1981-1985: Léon Antoine Bekaert (Belgium)
- 1986-1987: Philippe de Weck (Switzerland)
- 1988-1990: Ernst van den Biggelaar (The Netherlands)
- 1990-1993: Michel Albert (France)
- 1994-1996: Guy de Wouters (Belgium)
- 1997-2000: Domingo Sugranyes Bickel (Spain)
- 2000-2003: H. Onno Ruding (The Netherlands)
- 2003-2006: Etienne Wibaux (France)
- 2006-2009: José Ignacio Mariscal (Mexico)
- 2009-2014: Pierre Lecocq (France)
- 2014-2017: José Maria Simone (Argentina)
- 2017-2020: Rolando Medeiros (Chile)
- 2020-2024: Bruno Bobone (Portugal)
- 2024-today: Sigrid Marz (Germany)

== Sources ==
- http://www.lesedc.org/Uniapac.html
- http://www.christiansinpolitics.org/May-2005-The-UNIAPAC_a163.html
- Joseph B. Gremillon, The Catholic Movement of Employers and Managers: A Study of UNIAPAC, Gregorian University Press, 1961
- John D. Donovan, The Catholic Movement of Employers and Managers: A Study of UNIAPAC, Journal for the Scientific Study of Religion, Vol. 3, No. 2 (Spring, 1964), pp. 276–277
