= Roger De Clerck =

Belgian entrepreneur (1924–2015)

- Born: July 27, 1924; Wielsbeke
- Died: October 23, 2015 (aged 91)
- Spouse: Anne-Marie Hanssens

Roger De Clerck (July 27, 1924 – October 23, 2015) was a Belgian entrepreneur and CEO of the Beaulieu textile group. An international business man, his family was ranked 15th place in a list of "richest Belgians". During his lifetime he was controversial due to a series of scandals where he and his company were accused of fiscal fraud.

== Biography ==
De Clerck born in Wielsbeke, the second son of a flax farmer who owned a large farm, "Ter Lembeek" there. His two brothers became priests. He was a nephew of minister Albert De Clerck (father of politician Stefaan De Clerck) and the brother of Thérèse De Clerck, wife of Willy De Nolf, founder of Roularta.

In 1951, De Clerck married Anne-Marie Hanssens from Gullegem. In normal circumstances he would have taken over his father's farm, but the flax market collapsed around this time and he was forced to look for another source of income. De Clerck decided to produce looms and later carpets. In 1959 he founded the carpet company "Beaulieu", which became an international trader in the next few decades. He also became a politically active member of the CVP.

In 1991, because of internal struggles between his heirs, De Clerck divided his empire among them. Jan De Clerck received Domo. Luc became head of Berry Group. Mieke of Associated Weavers. Francis Ideal Group. Ann Beaulieu Kruishoutem and Dominiek Ter Lembeek. Five of his six children kept their head department in Belgium, only Mieke moved hers to the USA.

In 1992 Jan De Clerck's eleven-year-old son, Anthony De Clerck, was kidnapped by the gang of Danny Vanhamel. A ransom of 250 million Belgian francs was demanded, but after a month Anthony was freed and the kidnappers arrested.

During the 1990s and 2000s Beaulieu felt more rivalry from foreign companies. In 2005 four branches of the company were merged into one company Beaulieu International Group, which is still the largest West European carpet group. The only branches that were kept out were Domo (because Jan had fallen into dishonor with his father) and Beaulieu in America (which Mieke preferred to keep independent). At this point, none of the De Clercks was part of the daily management and in October 2005 De Clerck himself also stepped down.

== Scandals ==
In 1987, Roger De Clerck had his first run-in with the law. He was suspected of having exported large fortune from his companies to foreign countries under the veil of commission fees. A money export of about 1,5 to 2 billion Belgian francs were traced. He was found guilty, but his punishment was dismissed because his social position and the employment of his personnel could become endangered. In 1989 five business employees, including his sons Jan and Dominiek, spent a week in jail in England, because they had sold their carpets in black market money. Couriers smuggled the money in their clothing and luggage to Belgium. Two years later De Clerck bought his sons off with 2 million euro, without any prosecution or conviction coming about.

In 1997 Jan De Clerck and his partner Martine Van De Weghe were arrested. An associate of Jan, Ronny Verhoeven - who was a banker at Generale Bank in Sint-Niklaas - had laundered black market money through fake commission fees and bills. Verhoeven admitted this fraud in September 1997. In April 1998 Jan De Clerck was forced to do the same. Him and his wife admitted the fraud and paid 2,5 million euro. A year later they paid another 50 million euro to pay off their overdue personnel taxes and venture taxes. This caused a drift between them and the rest of the family, who kept repeating they were innocent.

Roger De Clerck himself was suspected from forgery of documents, gang organisation and violation of the laws for venture taxes. He was also thought to have tried to bribe investigation judges and researchers. The Beaulieu group was thought to have had paid fake commission payments to a Libanese business family for years. They officially acted as middle man for the sales in the Middle-East and Russia, but according to the researchers they were simply straw men. Their commission payments on sold products were meant to scoop off the profits of the Beaulieu branches and were returned to the family in the shape of loans, investments or black market money. The case kept going for years. In April 2014 it was revealed that a new research was started to clear out suspicions of whitewashing in a Luxembourgian venture. Business shares which belonged to a Libanese businessman were carried over to the De Clerck family.

== Reputation ==
Despite his massive wealth and large company imperium De Clerck was often nicknamed "Boer Clerck" ("Farmer Clerck") in the media, because of his roots in the farming industry, his local dialect and his simple-minded behavior. He detested this nickname himself.

In 1999 De Clerck celebrated his 75th birthday. This event attracted a lot of press attention when he invited world-famous politicians to meet him at his garden party, including Margaret Thatcher and George H. W. Bush. Mikhail Gorbachev was invited too, but had to excuse himself because his wife, Raisa Gorbachev, was seriously ill. She would die that same year. De Clerck's son Jan was not invited because he had fallen into disgrace.

== Death ==
De Clerck died in 2015 at the age of 91.
