= Gabriëlle Demedts =

Flemish Belgian poet

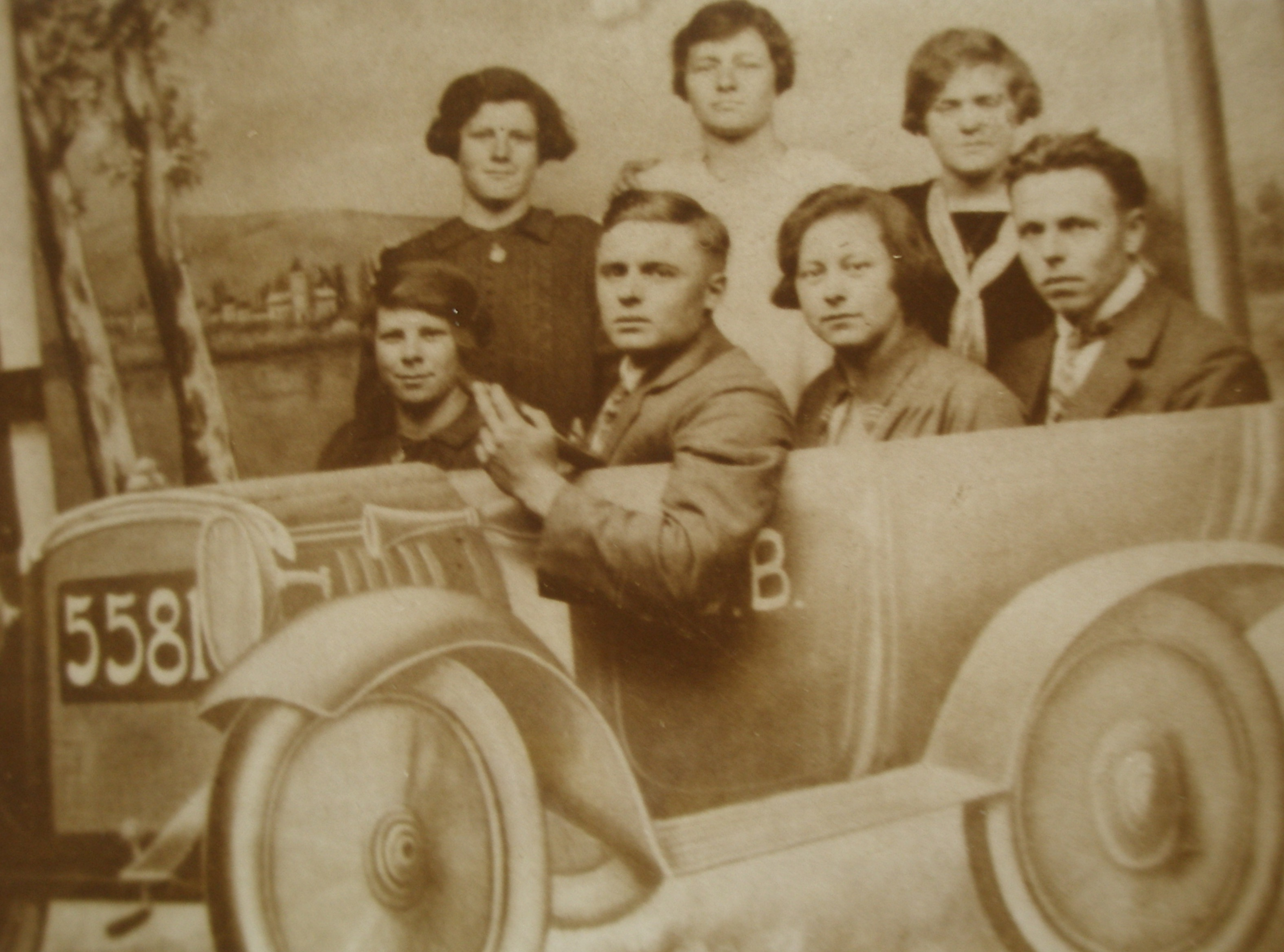
- Gabriëlle Demedts together with her brother André Demedts and with the Declercq family, around 1923.
- Born: Wielsbeke, Belgium
- Died: Kortrijk, Belgium
- Citizenship: Belgium
- Writing career
- Pen name: Maria Houtland
- Language: Dutch

Gabriëlle Demedts (Wielsbeke, June 11, 1909 – Kortrijk, September 6, 2002) was a Flemish Belgian poet. She was a sibling of André Demedts. In 1934 she wrote her first poems and in 1937 she published her first work "Een gevangene zingt" (The prisoner sings). As a young child she was struck by Poliomyelitis which has determined the rest of her life. In a book about the Declercq family, one can read that some of Demedts’ poems have been inspired by life-changing events in her life and that of the Declercqs. She wrote, for instance, '’Rustig lied’' (quiet song) and '’Lage tonen'’ (low vibes) after a love break-up of her friend Valentine Declercq, or '’Zomer’' (Summer) when Valentine was severely ill and dying. Later, she also wrote a poem, '’Ik heb gedaan...'’ (I am done…), when Ernest Constant Declercq, Valentine’s father and a close friend of Gabrielle Demedts’ parents, had died.

== Bibliography ==
- Een gevangene zingt (1937) (The prisoner sings)
- Een twijg in de wind (1939) (A twig in the wind)
- Morgen is alles uit (1940) (Tomorrow all is over)
- Verloren thuis (1946) (Lost home)
- De doorgang (1957) (Trespass)
- Levensberichten en liederen (1974) (Poems and Songs about life)
- Klanken van eeuwigheid in aardse stem (1974) (Songs of eternity in an earthly voice)
- Verzamelde gedichten (1979) (Collected poems)
