= André Demedts =

Belgian poet, writer and politician (1906–1992)

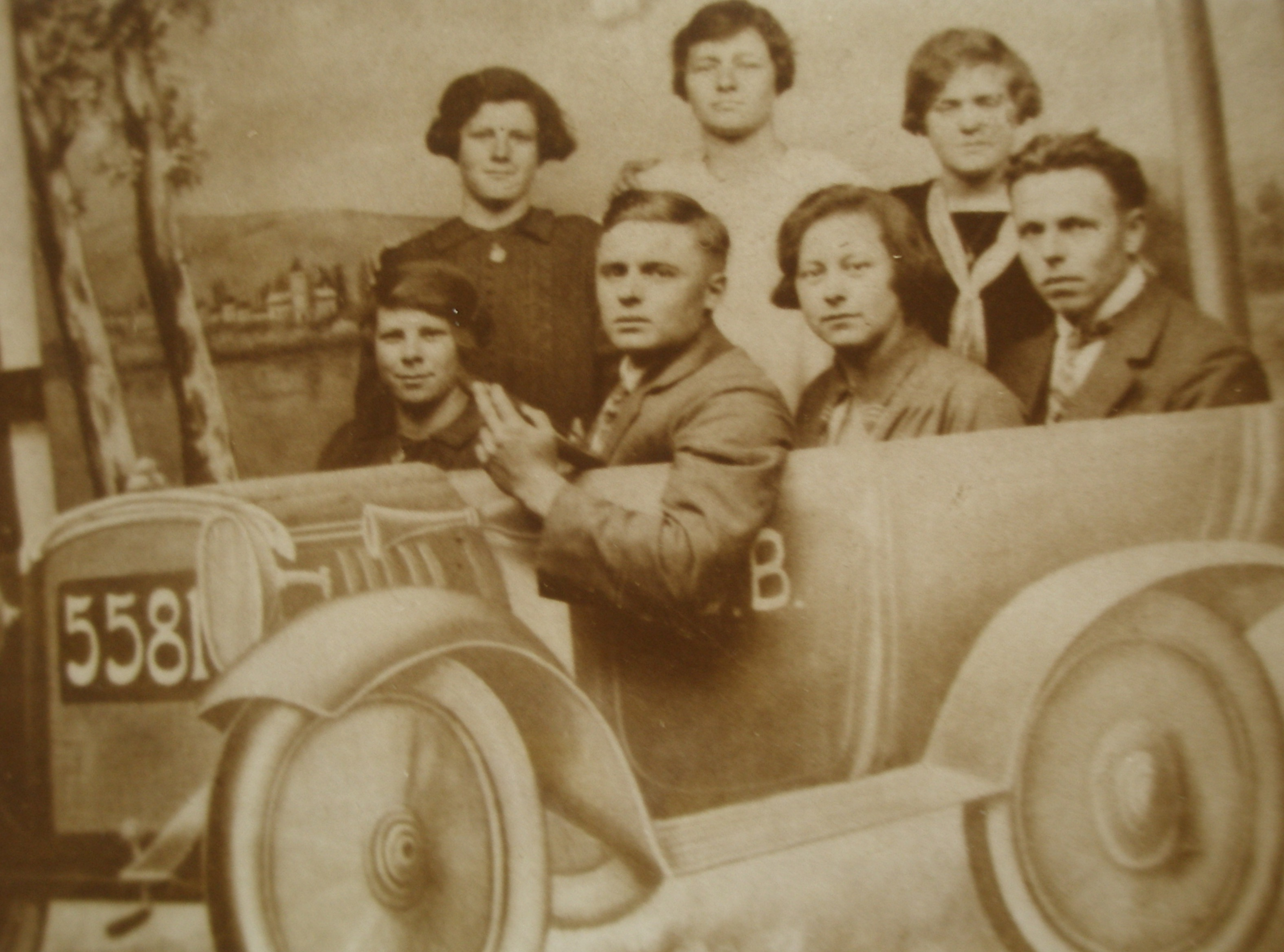
- André Demedts together with his sister Gabriëlle Demedts and with the Declercq family, around 1923.
- Born: 8 August 1906; Wielsbeke, Belgium
- Died: 4 November 1992 (aged 86); Oudenaarde, Belgium
- Citizenship: Belgium
- Writing career
- Pen name: Koen Lisarde
- Language: Dutch

André Demedts ((Wielsbeke), 8 August 1906 – Oudenaarde, 4 November 1992) was a Belgian Flemish writer and teacher. He has published works in many genres, all in Dutch. In 1962 he received the Prijs voor Letterkunde van de Vlaamse Provincies (Literature Award of the Flemish Provinces) for his work De levenden en de doden (The living and the death). In 1976 he received the award in honour of his life-time career. In 1990 he has received the Award "Driejaarlijkse Staatsprijs voor literatuur" to honour his career as a writer. In 1970 the award André Demedtsprijs was established to reward persons engaged in the cause of the large Dutch/Flemish cultural development with a main purpose to integrate and entangle cultural activities in the Netherlands, Flanders and South Africa.

== Bibliography ==
=== Poetry ===
- Daarna (1968) (Afterwards)
- De jaargetijden (1979) (The Seasons)
- Geploegde aarde (1931) (Plowed Soil)
- Jasmijnen (1929) (Jasmins)
- Kleine keuze (1937) (Minor Choices)
- Na jaar en dag (1986) (After a year and a day)
- Vaarwel (1940) (Goodbye)
- Verzamelde gedichten (1976) (Collected Poems)

=== Prose ===
- Afrekening (1938) (Settlement)
- Alleen door vuur (1965)
- De dag voor gisteren (autobiografie) (1966) (The day before yesterday)
- De levenden en de doden (1959) (The living and the death)
- De ring is gesloten (1951) (The ring has been stolen)
- Gedachten van André Demedts, gebloemleesd door Hubert van Herreweghen (1956) (Thoughts of André Demedts, anthology by Hubert Herreweghen)
- Geen tweede maal (1942) (Not a second time)
- Geluk voor iedereen (1981) (Happiness for all)
- Het heeft geen belang (1944) (It is of no importance)
- Het leven drijft (1936) (Life floats)
- Ik zal je dragen (1976) (I will carry you)
- In het morgenlicht (1949) (In dawn)
- In uw handen (1954) (In your hands)
- Je komen halen (1969) (To get you)
- Kerstmis te Saloniki en andere verhalen (1964) (Christmas at Saloniki and other stories)
- Mannen van de straat (1933) (Men of the street)
- Neerslag der dagen (1957) (Depression of the days)
- Nog lange tijd (1961) (A long time awaits)
- Terug naar huis (1970) (Back Home)
- Veertien-achttien (1985) (14–18)
- Voorbijgang (1939) (Pass by)
- Voor de avond valt (1947) (Before the evening comes)
- Wintertijd; een drieluik (1982) (Winter time : triptych)
- Zijn kleine waan (1939) (His minor delusion)

=== Youth books ===
- Alle vreugd is eindeloos (1946) – 2nd edition (1957) (Happiness is endless)
- Ik wil een dappere kerel zijn (1942) (I want to be a brave dude)
- Trouw aan hun volk (1944) – 2nd edition (1962) (Faithful to the people)
- Van Wiemkes gesproken (1976) (Seaking of Van Wiemkes)
- Voorbij aan de nacht (1952) (Beyond the night)

=== Drama ===
- De graaf is weergekeerd (1950) (The Earl has returned)
- De rechtvaardige keizer (1949) (The righteous Emperor)

=== Essays ===
- ’t Fonteintje (1977) (The fountain)
- Abel Coetzee (1963)
- De boer in de literatuur (1966) (The farmer in literature)
- De esthetica van H. Verriest (1974) (The Esthetics of Hugo Verriest)
- De Vlaamse poëzie tussen 1918 en 1941 (2 volumes) (1945) (Flemish Poetry between 1918 and 1941)
- Edward Vermeulen (1937)
- Ernest Claes (1962)
- Ernest Claes (1970)
- Het land van Streuvels (1971) (The land of Streuvels)
- Hugo Verriest, de levenwekker (1945) (Hugo Verries, the lifeworker)
- Guido Gezelles wedergeboorte 1877 (1977) (Guido Gezelle's reincarnation)
- Jan Vercammen (1977)
- Johan Daisne (1962)
- Leven en schoonheid (1951) (Life and Beauty)
- Nicolaas Beets, Anton Bergmann (1941)
- Over de Beneden-Mandel (1973) (About the lower Mandel river)
- Richard Minne (1946)
- Stijn Streuvels (1955)
- Stijn Streuvels (1977)
- Streuvels als psycholoog (1972) (Streuvels as Psychologist)
- Stijn Streuvels, een terugblik op leven en werk (1971) (Stijn Streuvels, a flashback on his life and work)
- Valère Depauw (1978)

=== Anthologies ===
- Moderne Vlaamse verhalen (1961) (Modern Flemish Tales)
- Vlaamse verhalen (1958) (Flemish Tales)
- Vlaamse verhalen van deze tijd (1963) (Contemporary Flemish Tales)
