= Jan Callewaert =

Belgian entrepreneur and football administrator (1956–2022)

- Born: 1956; Wielsbeke, Belgium
- Died: 1 February 2022 (aged 65–66); Leuven, Belgium
- Education: KU Leuven
- Occupation: Entrepreneur
- Known for: Founder of Option N.V.

Jan Callewaert (1956 – 1 February 2022) was a Belgian entrepreneur and football administrator. He founded the publicly traded technology company Option N.V., where he was chief executive officer and chairman. He was named Belgium's Manager of the Year for 2005 and chaired football club Oud-Heverlee Leuven from 2010 to 2014.

== Life and career ==
Callewaert was born in Wielsbeke in 1956. He earned a master's degree in commercial engineering and a bachelor's degree in philosophy from KU Leuven. After graduating, he worked as an assistant at VLEKHO and later held positions at Bull and Ericsson.

=== Option ===
In 1986, Callewaert founded Option, a company specializing in wireless technology, and became its chief executive officer and board chair. Option was named Belgium's Company of the Year in October 2005. Callewaert was named Manager of the Year for 2005 in January 2006.

In March 2017, Callewaert stepped aside as Option's chief executive officer. Former Barco chief executive Eric Van Zele became chair of the company.

=== Other activities ===
Callewaert was chair of Oud-Heverlee Leuven from May 2010 until November 2014 and was succeeded by Jimmy Houtput. During his tenure, the club won the 2010–11 Belgian Second Division and was promoted to the Belgian Pro League.

Callewaert died on 1 February 2022 at the age of 65.

== Bibliography ==
- Van de hemel naar de hel en weer terug (From Heaven to Hell and Back Again), Lannoo, 2006
