= Michel Albert =

French economist

- Born: 25 February 1930; Fontenay-le-Comte, France
- Died: 19 March 2015 (aged 85); Paris, France
- Education: Sciences Po, ÉNA
- Occupation: Economist

Michel Albert (French: [albɛʁ]; 25 February 1930 – 19 March 2015) was a French economist. He was born in Fontenay-le-Comte, Vendée, and was permanent secretary of the Académie des Sciences Morales et Politiques from 2005 to 2010.

== Education and career ==
Michel Albert graduated from the Institut d'Études Politiques de Paris (Sciences Po) and was also an alumnus of the École Nationale d'Administration (ENA). He became an inspector of finance in 1956.

Albert was chairman of the board and chief executive of Assurances Générales de France (AGF) between 1982 and 1994. When the Bank of France was made an independent central bank in 1994, he was one six advisers appointed by François Mitterrand, the Socialist president, to a monetary policy council. From 1990 to 1993 he was also president of the International Christian Union of Business Executives (UNIAPAC).

On 28 March 1994, Albert was elected as the chair of the Académie des Sciences Morales et Politiques following the death of Henri Guitton. He became president of the academy in 2004 and permanent secretary from 2005 to 2010.

In 2009 he was decorated with the Grand Cross of the National Order of Merit by the center-right president Nicolas Sarkozy.

== Economic views ==
Albert wrote several books, most notably the 1991 Capitalisme contre Capitalisme. In this he coined the term "Rhine capitalism" or Rhenish business model. This contrasted the (superior) West European regulated market economy (where government, employers' organisations, and labour unions consult each other about goals and policy) with the Anglo-Saxon shareholder economy, which focuses on maximising short-term profits for investors. The book gave a prescient warning about the banking system:

The largest banks know, however, that they are literally too big to fail and can count on a helping hand from government if the worst comes to the worst... Thus, in yet another intriguing but ominous irony of history, 10 years of ultra-liberalism have resulted in a US financial system whose future may only be assured with the help of federal government handouts.

The economics commentator John Kay summarised a "caricature" by Albert of the two historical traditions that led to the modern insurance industry:

In London, English gentlemen would gather in Lloyd's Coffee House to speculate on the state of the world and the weather. They would gamble on the fate of ships. Meanwhile, in Swiss mountain villages, farmers might agree that if one of their cows died, the whole community would contribute to provide a replacement.

== Personal life ==
He married Claude Balland. He had four sons, Jean-Marc, Eric, Pierre-Emmanuel and Christopher, and was the grandfather of nine children.
