= Léon Bekaert =

Belgian industrialist and politician (1891–1961)

Léon Antoine Bekaert (Zwevegem, 9 December 1891 - Zwevegem, 19 December 1961) was a Belgian industrialist and politician. He was the son of Leo Leander Bekaert, who founded the family business in 1880.

He expanded the family venture Tréfileries Léon Bekaert (1935), at Zwevegem (production of steel wire) into Bekaert, a global company. He was President of the League of Christian Employers (1934–1961) and President of the Belgian league of the metallurgical industry (Fabrimetal) from 1946 up to 1952, after which he accepted the chairmanship of the Federation of Belgian Enterprises. From 1926 until his death, he was burgomaster of Zwevegem and of 1938 up to beginning 1961 he was regent of the National Bank of Belgium. In 1958, he was one of the co-founders of the permanent international secretariat of the UNIAPAC in Brussels, together with Peter H. Werhahn and Giuseppe Mosca, who became its president.

== See also ==
- Leon Bekaert.
- Léon Bekaert in ODIS - Online Database for Intermediary Structures
- Archive of Léon Bekaert in ODIS - Online Database for Intermediary Structures

== Sources ==
- Vandeputte R. Leon A. Bekaert. Een groot man. Een goed mens.(1891–1961), Lannoo, 1979.
