= Bruno Bobone =

Portuguese businessperson (born 1960)

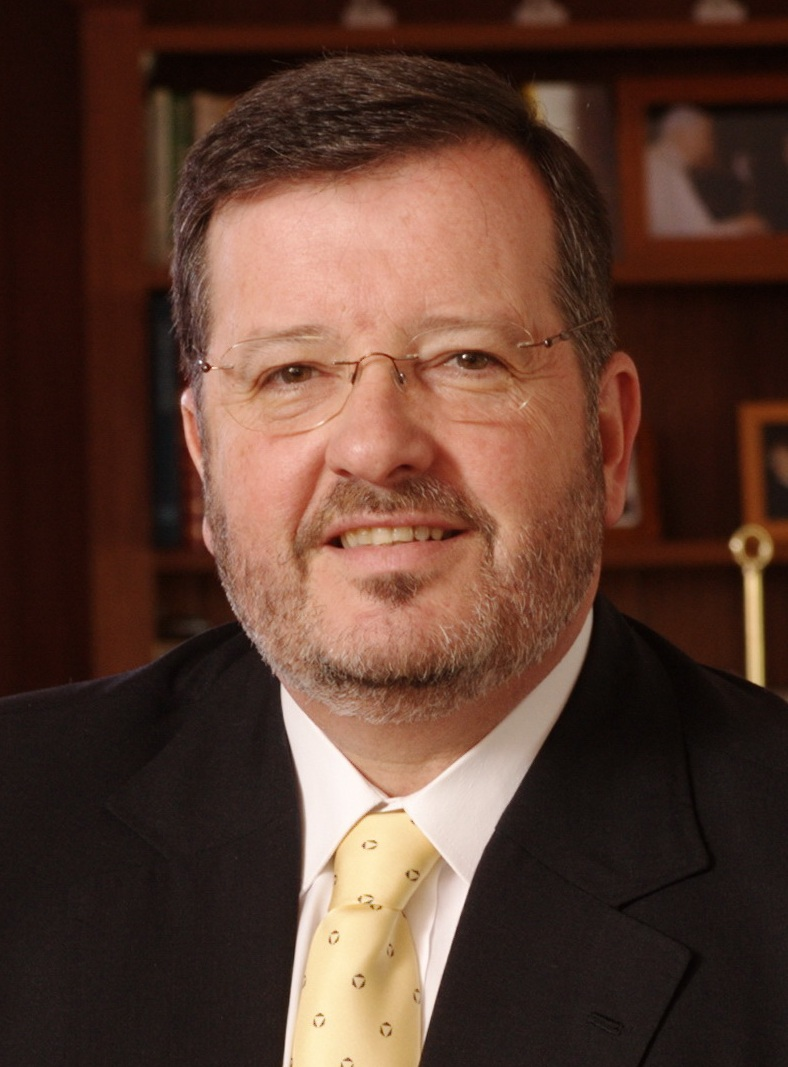
- Born: 23 September 1960 (age 65); Lisbon, Portugal
- Occupation: CEO
- Writing career
- Language: Portuguese
- Website: brunobobone.com

Bruno Carlos Pinto Basto Bobone (born 23 September 1960) is a Portuguese businessman. He serves president of the Chamber of Commerce and Industry of Portugal (CCIP) and the Board of Directors of the Pinto Basto Group.

== Early life ==
Bruno Bobone was born while his parents, colonial settlers from Portuguese Mozambique, vacationed in Portugal. He spent most of his childhood and the first part of adolescence in Mozambique until 25 April 1974, when he moved Portugal.

In 1984 Bobone graduated in Management at the University of Lisbon.

== Career ==
After completing his studies in management, he joined the family company Grupo Pinto Basto, dedicated to maritime services.

His professional career includes administrator of the Aleluia - Ceramics, Commerce and Industry, administrator of the VA Group - Vista Alegre Participaciones, SA and administrator of the Caima Ceramics and Services. He chairs the Board of Directors of the Pinto Basto Group. He serves as Vice Chairman of the ASK Advisory Services Kapital SA and Director of the Agricultural Society of Quinta de Fôja.

== Civil society organisations ==
Bobone serves in civil society organisations. He was European president, world vice president and is currently a member of the International Board of the International Christian Union of Business Executives - UNIAPAC.

He was vice president of the Christian Association of Entrepreneurs and Managers and President of the General Assembly of the Ocean Forum.

== Chamber of Commerce and Portuguese Industry ==
In 2005, he assumed the presidency of the Portuguese Chamber of Commerce and Industry, a private business association serving Portuguese companies since 1834. The association promotes the development of its associates nationally and internationally.

Bobone revived the network of Chambers of Commerce abroad and, more recently, achieved the network's recognition by the Portuguese State. During the 12 years he has served as president of the Portuguese Chamber of Commerce and Industry, he has been at the forefront of entrepreneurship and SME development in Portugal
