= Crescent (Belgian company) =

Belgian technology company

Option
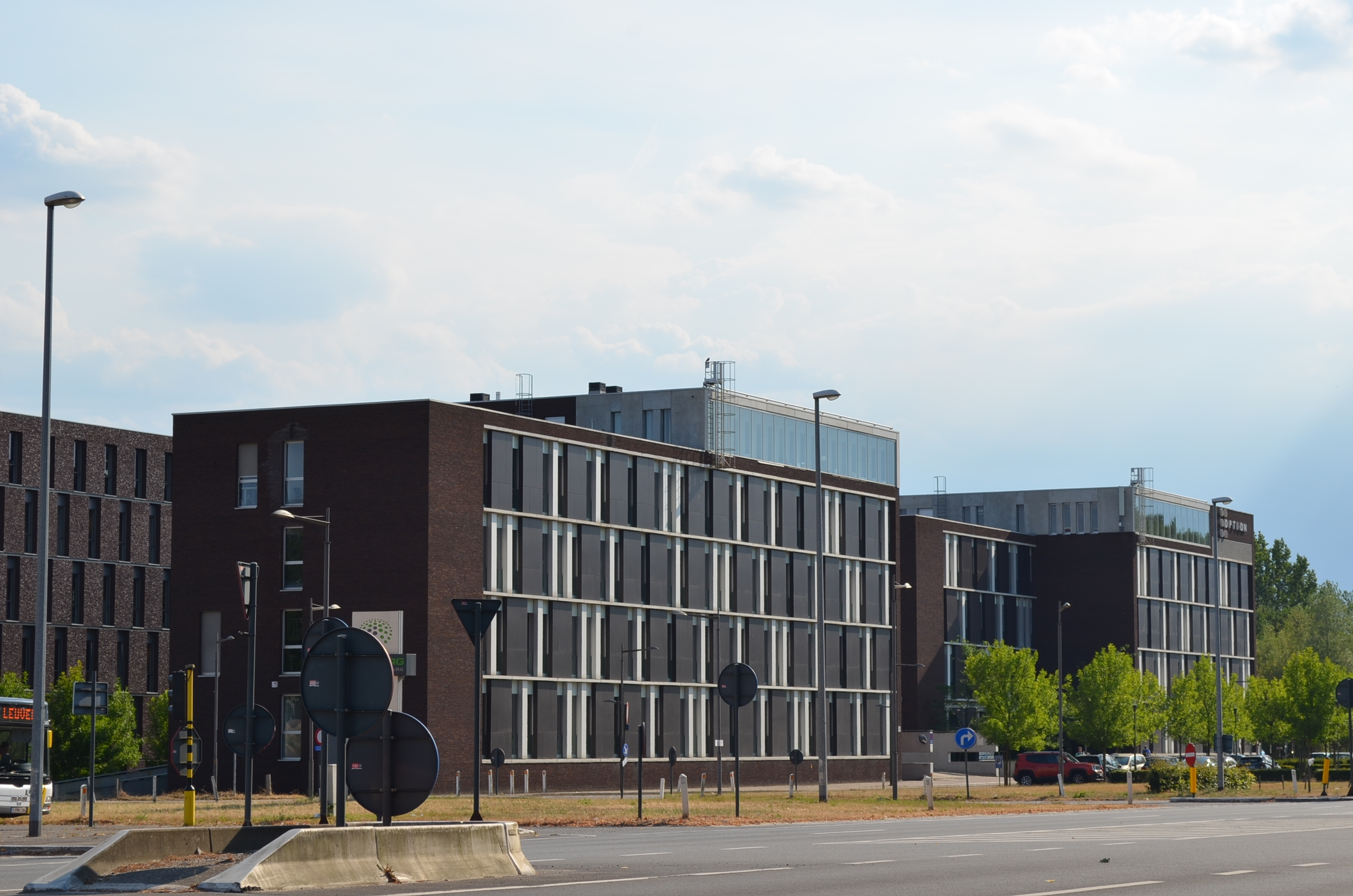
- Option Headquarters in Leuven, Belgium
- Type: Public; NV
- Industry: Telecommunications, Wireless technology
- Founded: Leuven, Belgium (1986)
- Headquarters: Leuven, Belgium
- Key people: Jan Callewaert, Founder in 1986
- Products: Data cards Embedded wireless modules Mobile connectivity devices Software
- Revenue: ▲€4.3 million (2016)
- Net income: ▼€7.5 million (2016)
- Number of employees: 38 as of 2016
- Website: www.option.com

Option is a publicly quoted technology company, headquartered in Leuven, Belgium. Option specializes in the design, development, production and commercialization of broadband Wireless technology devices. Option has been awarded Ernst & Young's ‘Company of the Year’ award for 2005.

== Products ==
Remarkable was the GlobeTrotter Fusion+ card which was the first to integrate HSDPA/UMTS/EDGE/Wi-Fi technologies on a single data card.

Option was the worldwide market leader in the wireless broadband niche (other market contestants are either significantly smaller, or do not consider wireless broadband a core business – for example NEC Corporation), and could benefit from high margins across the whole product range. Intentions from a new Intel-Nokia partnership which would deteriorate Option's market share were short-lived and quickly dropped, proving Option's leadership as well as high entry-to-market barriers even for large corporations. Most production took place at Jabil in Bergamo, Italy, while Celestica in Kladno, Czech Republic, provides additional capacity. Nowadays, all manufacturing of devices is done in Wuxi, China. The products were marked as having been designed in Leuven, but actually are refurbished and labelled in Ireland.

== Financials ==
Initial market panic stemming from the announced Intel-Nokia deal did cause Option's share price to drop significantly in 2006, losing more than 23% in one day on September 28, which lies, together with the severe Chinese competition, at the basis of the downfall of the company .

== Customers ==
Option's revenues substantially declined last years. In the past, Option had the following customers in their portfolio Sharp Corporation, Wataniya Telecom, Fujitsu Siemens, T-Mobile, Cingular Wireless (now AT&T), Vodafone, Orange, Airtel, Telstra, Acer, Uniwill, Samsung Electronics and Telenor, to name but a few.
