= Joghem van Loghem =

Dutch physician

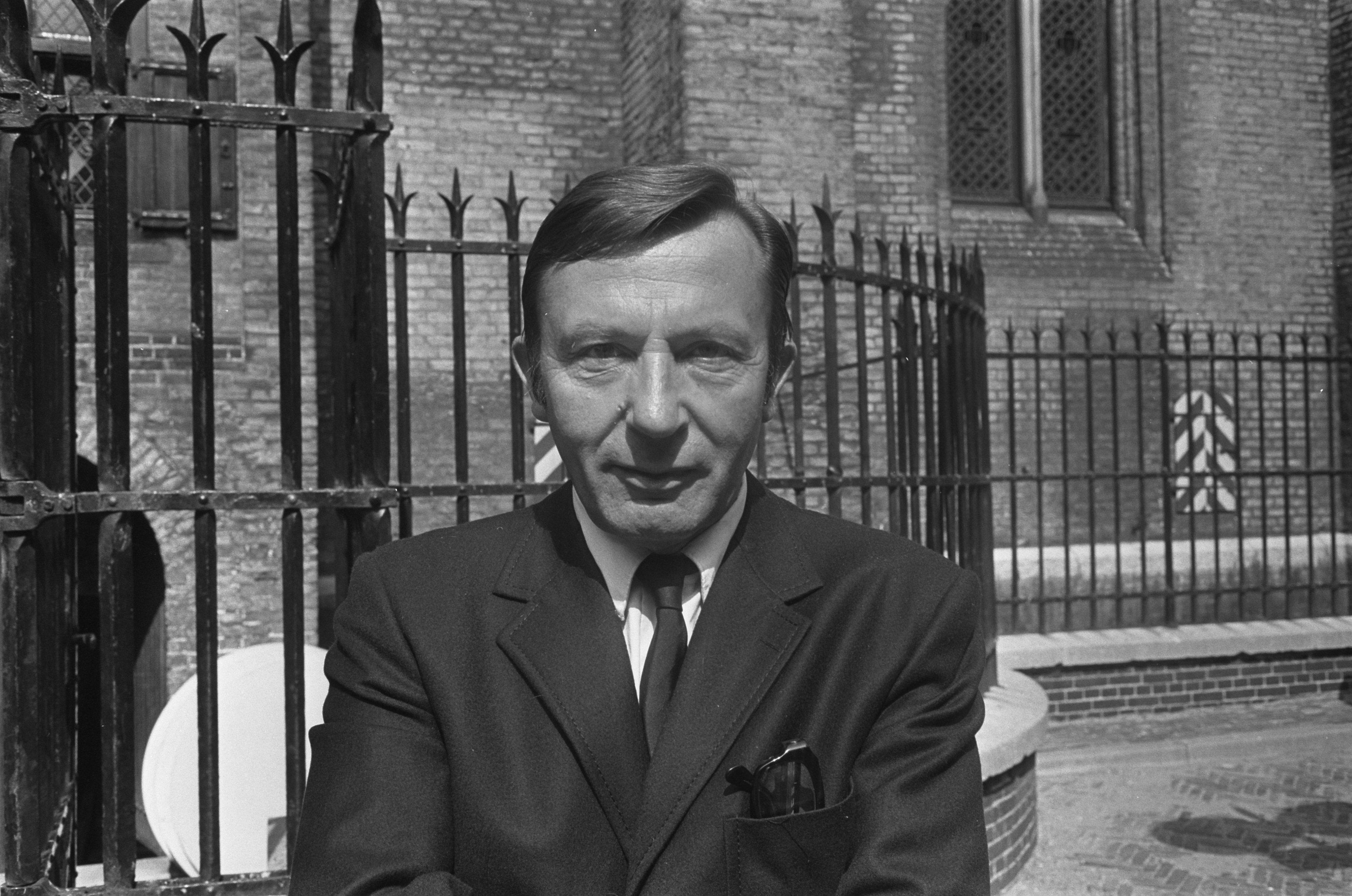
Joghem van Loghem

Johannes Jacobus (Joghem) van Loghem (1914-2005), was a professor of internal medicine at the Wilhelmina Gasthuis in Amsterdam renowned for his work in blood group serology and immunohaematology.
