= Leon Bekaert =

Belgian businessman

Leon baron Bekaert (born 1958) is a Belgian businessman. He started his career in 1983 as Managing Partner of Pauli Philippines (Manila) and in 1984 transferred in 1984 to P.T. LVD Indonesia as managing director. In 1987 he joined the Bekaert Group as Sales Manager Bekaert Hong Kong and in 1989 he was appointed as Strategic Project Manager and in 1991 Product Manager Fencing Products. Leon Bekaert left the Beakert Group in 1994 and became a member of the Board. He holds a degree in Applied Economics from the Katholieke Universiteit Leuven (1983) and obtained an MBA at the IMI in Geneva in 1987.

== See also ==
- Léon Bekaert

== Sources ==
- Leon Bekaert
- De vijfentwintig rijkste Vlamingen: brouwers boven
