= Romuald Burkard =

Swiss industrialist (1925–2004)

- Born: Romuald Burkard; 27 January 1925; St. Gallen, Switzerland
- Died: 2004 (aged 78–79); Switzerland
- Education: University of St. Gallen (Dr. rer. pol.
- Occupations: Industrialist, businessman, aviculturist
- Known for: Leading and owning Sika Ltd
- Spouse: Franziska Schenker (m. 1953)
- Children: 5

Romuald Burkard (27 January 1925 – 2004) was a Swiss industrialist, business executive and aviculturist who served as CEO and Chairman of Sika Ltd, listed in the Swiss Market Index.

== Early life and education ==
Burkard was born 27 January 1925 in St. Gallen, Switzerland, to Johann Burkard, an architect, and Bertha Klara Burkard (née Müller). His paternal family was originally from Waltenschwil, Aargau. He completed the local schools and studied Economics at the University of St. Gallen followed by his promotion in social studies at the University of Fribourg (Dr. rer. pol.).

== Career ==
In 1952, Burkard entered Kaspar Winkler AG, then a producer of additives to the construction industry, which would later become Sika Ltd.. He initially was employed in sales and ultimately took over management after the marriage to the only heiress to the company, in 1961. He became a delegate of the board in 1968 and in 1971 became chairman of the board.

Under his leadership, the company became a multinational conglomerate, of considerable size.

== Personal life ==
In 1953, Burkard married Franziska Schenker, the only daughter of Fritz A. Schenker and Klara Schenker (née Winkler). Her maternal grandfather was Austrian-born Kaspar Winkler, who founded Sika Ltd., in 1910. They had five children;

- Gabriella Burkard (born 1954)
- Monica Burkard (born 1955)
- Urs Fritz Burkard (born 1957)
- Carmita Barbara Burkard (born 1965), married to Thomas Kroeber, no children. She is the major benefactor of Green Party of Switzerland.
- Fritz Hannes Kaspar Burkard (born 1967), married to American-born Jennifer Gordon (born 1976), with whom he had six children. He is a resident of St. Moritz and Stowe, Vermont and primarily known for his car collection as well as real estate investments.

Burkard was a resident of Küsnacht on Lake Zurich, Switzerland. He was an avid aviculturist keeping and breeding rare species of parrots. He owned the largest private aviary in the Canton of Zug. Burkard died in 2004 aged 79.
