= Beaulieu International Group =

Beaulieu International Group is a Belgian textile manufacturing company, with its head office located in Waregem, a municipality of West Flanders which is known for its textile industry.

== History ==
The company was founded as Beaulieu in 1959 by Roger De Clerck as a fabric production business. Between 1959 and 1991 Beaulieu expanded and grew into a vertical integrated company. In 1991 the company was split-up in seven parts between Roger De Clerck and his six children. Roger De Clerck remained in charge of raw materials. Between 1991 and 2005 the changing market conditions led to an overcapacity in the European textile industry and growing international competition. Finally in 2005 five of the seven branches of the Beaulieu Group merged and became the Beaulieu International Group.

In 1978 the American offshoot, "Beaulieu of America", was created by Roger De Clerck's son-in-law Carl Bouckaert and his daughter Mieke De Clerck. Beaulieu of America declared bankruptcy on 17 July 2017 and, after the company's reorganization efforts failed, Beaulieu of America's assets were acquired by Engineered Floors in a deal announced on 20 September 2017.

== See also ==
- Textile manufacturing
- Textile manufacturing terminology

== Sources ==
- Mega-fusie (Dutch)
- Beaulieu International Group ziet het levenslicht (Dutch)
