= Jan Greshoff =

Dutch journalist, poet and literary critic

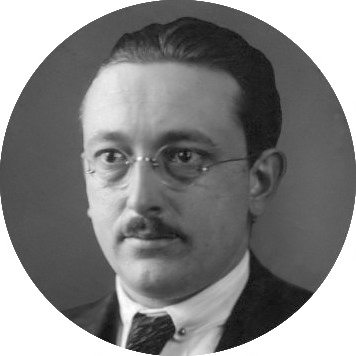
Jan Greshoff (1920)

Jan Greshoff (15 December 1888, Nieuw-Helvoet – 19 March 1971, Cape Town) was a Dutch journalist, poet, and literary critic. He was the 1967 recipient of the Constantijn Huygens Prize.

== Partial list of works ==
- 1909 – Aan den verlaten vijver
- 1910 – Door mijn open venster...
- 1918 – Latijnsche lente
- 1924 – De ceder
- 1924 – Mengelstoffen o.h. gebied der Fransche Letterkunde
- 1925 – Dichters in het koffyhuis (onder pseudoniem van Otto P. Reys)
- 1925 – Sparsa
- 1925 – Geschiedenis der Nederl. letterk. (met J. de Vries)
- 1926 – Aardsch en hemelsch
- 1926 – Zeven gedichten
- 1927 – De Wieken van den Molen
- 1929 – Bij feestelijke gelegenheden
- 1928 – Confetti
- 1930 – Currente calamo
- 1931 – Spijkers met koppen
- 1932 – Janus Bifrons
- 1932 – Mirliton
- 1932 – Voetzoekers
- 1933 – Pro domo
- 1934 – Arthur van Schendel
- 1936 – Critische vlugschriften
- 1936 – Gedichten, 1907-1936
- 1936 – Rebuten
- 1938 – Ikaros bekeerd
- 1938 – In alle ernst
- 1939 – Steenen voor brood
- 1941 – Fabrieksgeheimen
- 1943 – Muze, mijn vriendin
- 1944 – Catrijntje Afrika
- 1944 – Het spel der spelen
- 1948 – Zwanen pesten
- 1948 – Gedichten
- 1948 – Legkaart
- 1950 – Het boek der vriendschap
- 1950 – Grensgebied
- 1955 – Marnix Gijsen (met R. Goris)
- 1956 – Volière (Aviary)
- 1956-1958 – De laatste dingen (The Last Things)
- 1957 – Bric à brac (Bric à Brac)
- 1958 – Menagerie (Menagerie)
- 1958 – Nachtschade (Nightshade)
- 1958 – Pluis en niet pluis
- 1964 – Wachten op Charon (Waiting For Charon)
- 1967 – Verzamelde gedichten 1907-1967 (Collected Poems 1907–1967)
- 1968 – Wind wind (Wing Wind)
- 1969 – Afscheid van Europa (Farewell To Europe)

== Awards ==
- 1927: Prize of Amsterdam
- 1967: Constantijn Huygens Prize
