= Wielsbeke =

- Municipality
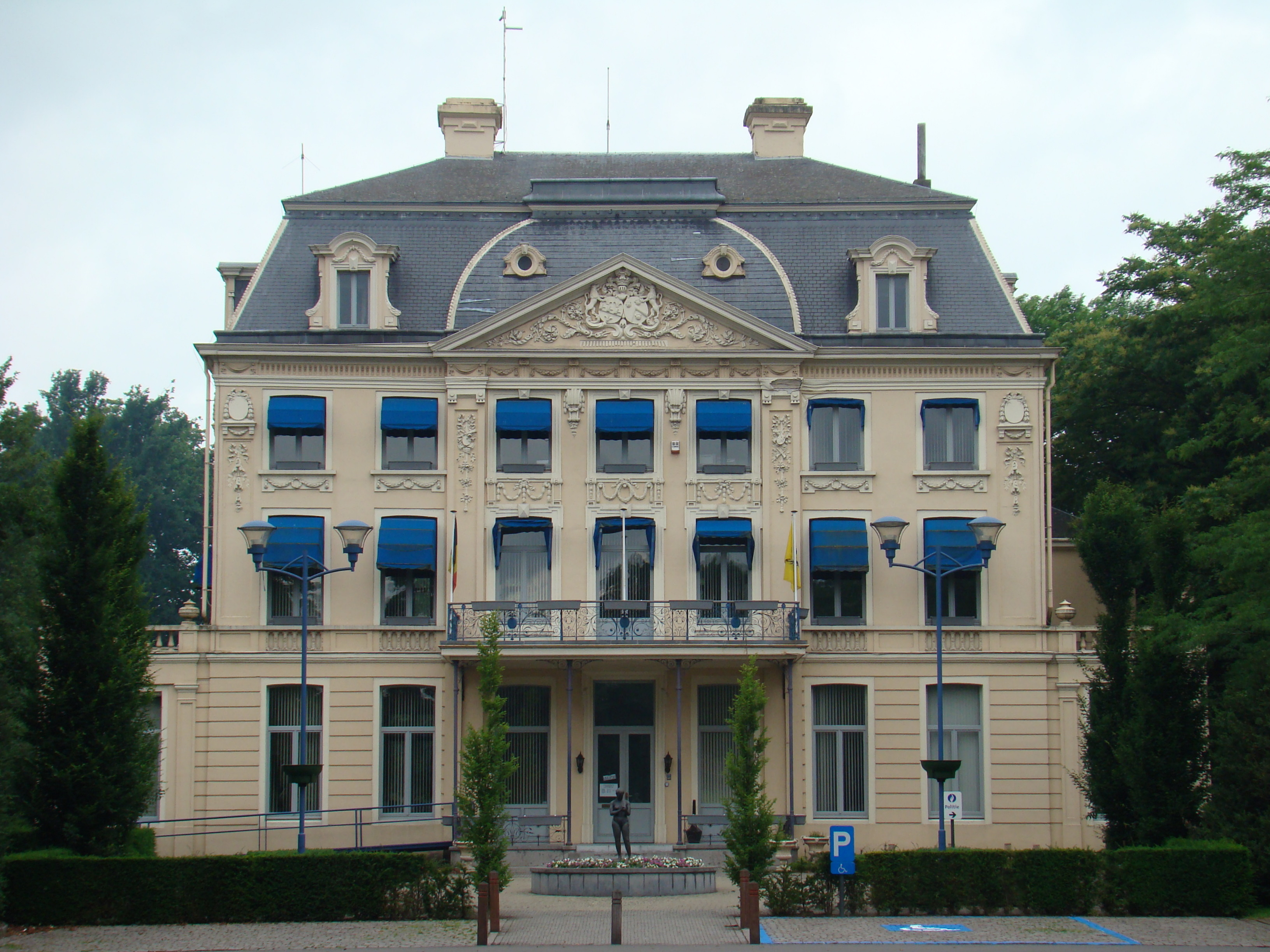
- Castle Hernieuwenburg, now town hall

- Flag Coat of arms

- Location of Wielsbeke in West Flanders
- Interactive map of Wielsbeke
- Location in Belgium
- Coordinates: 50°54′N 03°22′E
- Country: Belgium
- Community: Flemish Community
- Region: Flemish Region
- Province: West Flanders
- Arrondissement: Tielt

Government
  - Mayor: Jan Stevens (CD&V)
  - Governing party: CD&V

Area
  - Total: 21.91 km^{2} (8.46 sq mi)

Population (2018-01-01)
  - Total: 9,584
  - Density: 437.4/km^{2} (1,133/sq mi)
- Postal codes: 8710
- NIS code: 37017
- Area codes: 056
- Website: www.wielsbeke.be

Wielsbeke (Dutch pronunciation: [ˈʋilzˌbeːkə]) is a municipality located in the Belgian province of West Flanders. The municipality comprises the towns of Ooigem, Sint-Baafs-Vijve and Wielsbeke proper. On January 1, 2018, Wielsbeke had a total population of 9,584. The total area is 21.76 km^{2} which gives a population density of 440 inhabitants per km^{2}.

== Notable people ==
- Jan Callewaert (b. Wielsbeke, 1956), founder of Option N.V.
- Niko Eeckhout, a professional road racing cyclist. He was the champion of Belgium in 2006.
- Noël Demeulenaere, a cycling patron and former mayor of the village.
- Wim Vromant writes books for children.
- Tessa Wullaert, professional footballer who plays as a forward for Anderlecht and the Belgium national team.

== Images ==
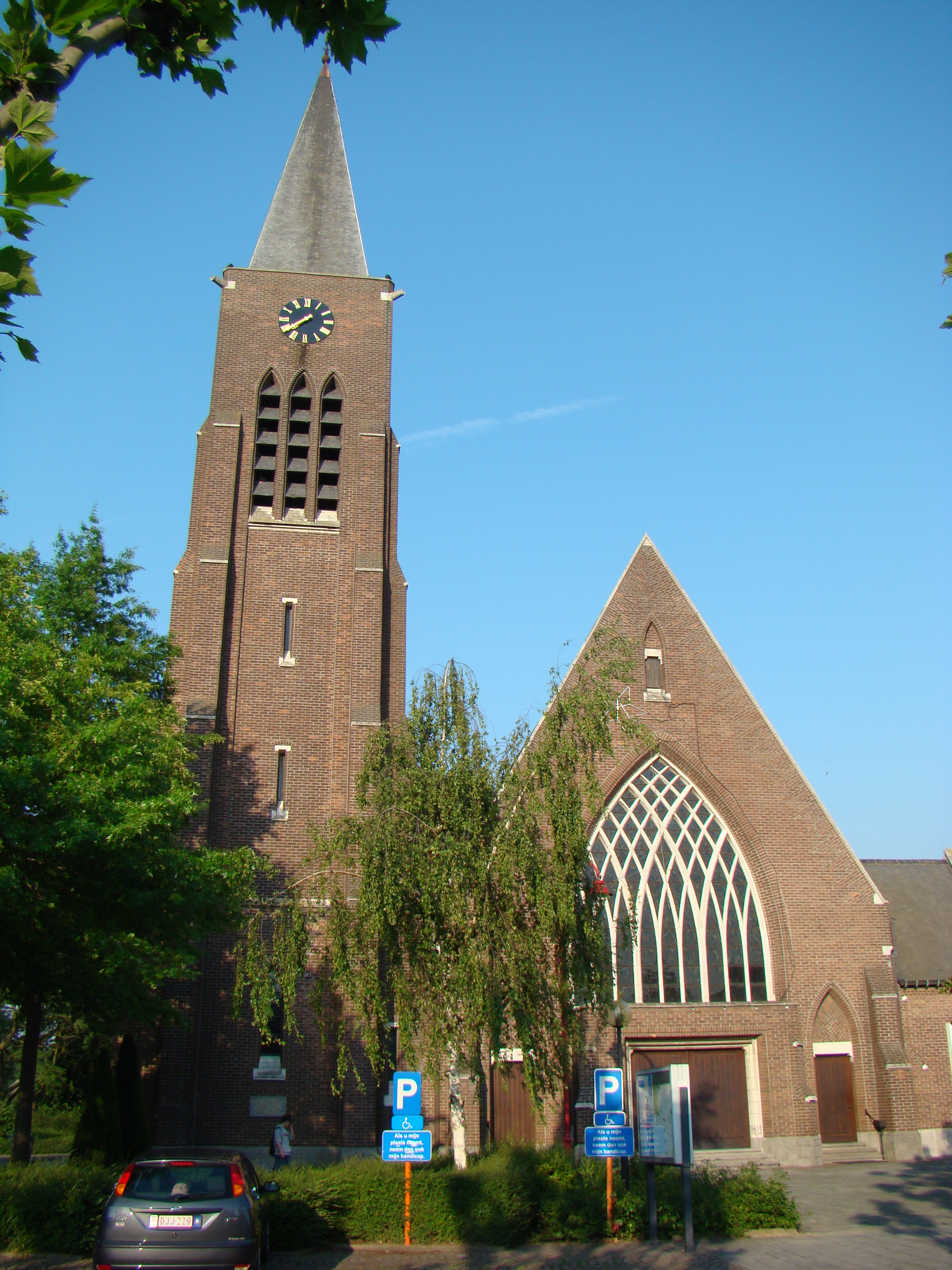
Sint Laurentius church

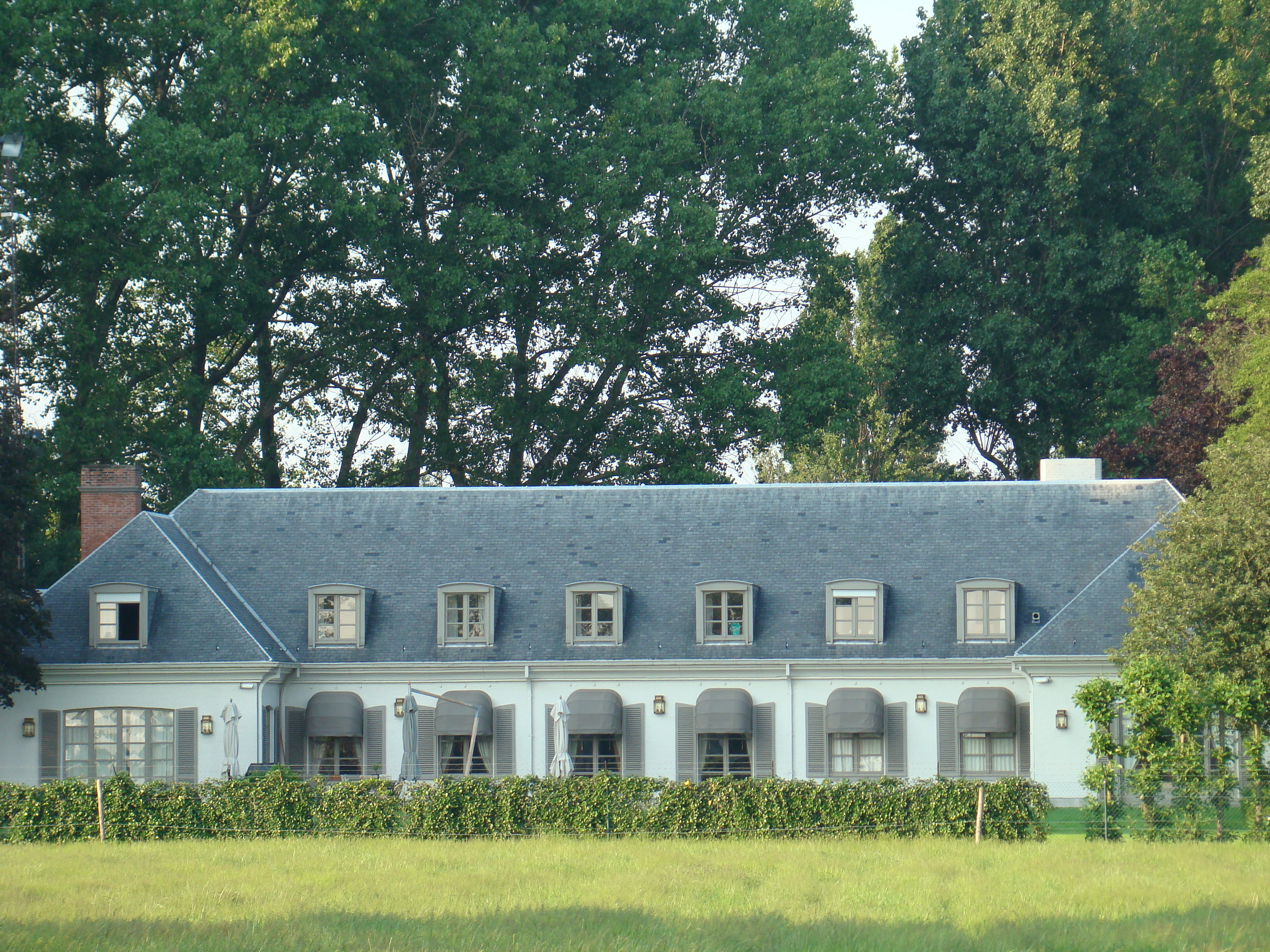
Birth house of the second generation of the family De Clerck, founders of the Beaulieu group

== See also ==
- Beaulieu International Group
