= Buddleja microstachya =

Scientific classification
- Kingdom: Plantae
- Clade: Tracheophytes
- Clade: Angiosperms
- Clade: Eudicots
- Clade: Asterids
- Order: Lamiales
- Family: Scrophulariaceae
- Genus: Buddleja
- Species: B. microstachya

Binomial name
- Buddleja microstachya E. D. Liu

Species of plant

Buddleja microstachya is a small shrub discovered in 2005 by Liu and Peng in Yunnan, China, growing at an elevation of 3,200 m in rocky terrain of the Yongde Mountains Nature Reserve. First described in 2006, this putative species was not included in Leeuwenberg's study of Asiatic and African buddleja published in 1979.

== Description ==
Buddleja microstachya grows to 1–2 m in height in the wild. The branchlets are quadrangular and densely tomentose, the bark of old branches peeling. The leaves are lanceolate, 1.5–5.0 cm long by 0.5–1.3 cm wide, tomentose above, densely tomentose below. The small terminal inflorescences consist of two or three flowers forming a cyme, several cymes forming a compact panicle. The corolla is lavender to white, cylindrical, 4–6 mm long and densely tomentose outside.

Buddleja microstachya most closely resembles B. yunnanensis but differs in flower morphology and has a very isolated range, whereas B. yunnanensis has a wide distribution.

== Cultivation ==
Buddleja microstachya is not known to be in cultivation.
