= Buddleja bullata =

Scientific classification
- Kingdom: Plantae
- Clade: Tracheophytes
- Clade: Angiosperms
- Clade: Eudicots
- Clade: Asterids
- Order: Lamiales
- Family: Scrophulariaceae
- Genus: Buddleja
- Species: B. bullata

Binomial name
- Buddleja bullata Kunth

Synonyms
- Buddleja lindenii Benth.; Buddleja mollis Kunth; Buddleja mollis Kunth var. angustifolia Kunth; Buddleja myriantha Kraenzl.; Buddleja obovata Kraenzl.; Buddleja verleyseniana Gilg; Buddleja vernixia Kraenzl.

Species of tree

Buddleja bullata is a variable species endemic to the Andes, from Venezuela south through Colombia and Ecuador to Peru, at elevations of 1,800–3,600 m, where it grows on stream beds and in the remnants of montane forest. The species was first described and named by Kunth in 1818.

== Description ==
Buddleja bullata is a dioecious shrub or small tree 1 – 10 m high, with a greyish-tan bark. The branches are subquadrangular and tomentose. The membraneous or subcoriaceous leaves are elliptic, lanceolate or ovate, 8–22 cm long by 3–8 cm wide, glabrescent, often bullate, above and covered with a white or yellowish tomentum below. The cream or yellow inflorescences are paniculate 7–25 cm long by 7–20 cm wide, comprising globose heads about 1 cm in diameter, each with 6–12 flowers; the corollas are 2.5–3.5 mm long.

== Hybrids ==
The species is believed to hybridize with B. pichinchensis in the wild.
