= B. diffusa =

B. diffusa may refer to:

- Boerhavia diffusa, the tar vine, punarnava or red spiderling, a flowering plant species
- Buddleja diffusa, a plant species endemic to central Peru and northern Argentina

== See also ==
- List of Latin and Greek words commonly used in systematic names#D
