= Buddleja cardanesii =

Scientific classification
- Kingdom: Plantae
- Clade: Tracheophytes
- Clade: Angiosperms
- Clade: Eudicots
- Clade: Asterids
- Order: Lamiales
- Family: Scrophulariaceae
- Genus: Buddleja
- Species: B. cardenasii

Binomial name
- Buddleja cardenasii Standl. ex E M Norman

Species of flowering plant

Buddleja cardenasii is a species endemic only to the region of Cochabamba in Bolivia at an altitude of around 3,000 m. The species was first described and named by Standley in 1935.

== Description ==
Buddleja cardenasii is a dioecious shrub 3–4 m high, with branches which are subquadrangular and tomentose. The subcoriaceous leaves are elliptic, lanceolate or ovate, 10–12 cm long by 8 cm wide, with a glabrescent and rugose upper surface. The orange inflorescences are paniculate 7–25 cm long by 7–20 cm wide, comprising cymes each with 6–9 flowers; the corollas are 3–3.5 mm long.

The species is very similar to B. soratae; further research may well prove them conspecific.

== Cultivation ==
The shrub is not known to be in cultivation.
