= Buddleja filibracteolata =

Scientific classification
- Kingdom: Plantae
- Clade: Tracheophytes
- Clade: Angiosperms
- Clade: Eudicots
- Clade: Asterids
- Order: Lamiales
- Family: Scrophulariaceae
- Genus: Buddleja
- Species: B. filibracteolata

Binomial name
- Buddleja filibracteolata J.A.González & J.F.Morales

Species of flowering plant native to Costa Rica

Buddleja filibracteolata is a species of flowering plant in the family Scrophulariaceae, native to the rainforests of Costa Rica. It was first described by J.A.González and J.F.Morales in 2007.

== Description ==
Buddleja filibracteolata is a shrub growing 0.9–1.3 m in height. Stems are glabrous; leaves are opposite, sessile, narrowly elliptic, measuring 3–10 cm to 0.7–2.1 cm. Inflorescences are 2–5 cm long, terminal, spike-shaped, with the corolla usually white in colour.

It distinguished from other species such as Buddleja crotonoides by its sessile leaves, amplexicaul leaf blades, and spike-shaped inflorescence with the many conspicuous threadlike bracts to which the species owes its name.

== Distribution and habitat ==
It occurs in rainforests and areas of high vegetation associated with ravines, at elevations of 1000-1200 m.
