= Buddleja corrugata =

Scientific classification
- Kingdom: Plantae
- Clade: Tracheophytes
- Clade: Angiosperms
- Clade: Eudicots
- Clade: Asterids
- Order: Lamiales
- Family: Scrophulariaceae
- Genus: Buddleja
- Species: B. corrugata

Binomial name
- Buddleja corrugata M. E. Jones

Species of flowering plant

Buddleja corrugata is a species endemic to north-western Mexico including the Baja California Sur, growing on limestone at altitudes of 200–1900 m; it was first described and named by Jones in 1933.

== Description ==
Buddleja corrugata is a small, dioecious, multi-branched shrub 0.1–1 m high, with grey-black rimose bark. The young branches are terete and tomentose, bearing small, sessile, subcoriaceous ovate, ovate-oblong, or linear, leaves 1–4 cm long by 0.2–3 cm wide. The yellow or orange inflorescences comprise 3–8 pairs of globose heads 0.5–1 cm in diameter, each with 6–20 flowers, subtended by short bracts; the corolla tubes are 2–4 mm long.

The species is considered closely related to Buddleja utahensis and Buddleja marrubiifolia.

== Subspecies ==
Jones identified three subspecies, distinguished by differences in the leaves:

- B. corrugata subsp. corrugata
- B. corrugata subsp. gentryi
- B. corrugata subsp. moranii

== Cultivation ==
The species is not known to be in cultivation.
