= Buddleja suaveolens =

Scientific classification
- Kingdom: Plantae
- Clade: Embryophytes
- Clade: Tracheophytes
- Clade: Spermatophytes
- Clade: Angiosperms
- Clade: Eudicots
- Clade: Asterids
- Order: Lamiales
- Family: Scrophulariaceae
- Genus: Buddleja
- Species: B. suaveolens

Binomial name
- Buddleja suaveolens Kunth & C.D.Bouché

Synonyms
- Buddleja gayana Benth.

Species of flowering plant

Buddleja suaveolens is a species of flowering plant in the family Scrophulariaceae. It is endemic to central Chile, growing mostly in rocky areas along rivers at elevations of 500 – 2,900 m. The species was first named and described by Carl Sigismund Kunth and Carl David Bouché in 1845.

== Description ==
Buddleja suaveolens is a dioecious shrub 1 – 4 m tall, with grey fissured bark and persistent dead naked branches. The young branches are yellow, terete and tomentulose, bearing small sessile, elliptic to oblong subcoriaceous leaves, 0.5 – 3 cm long by 0.2 – 1 cm wide, glabrescent above but tomentose below. The yellowish orange leafy inflorescences comprise one terminal and 2 – 7 pairs of heads in the axils of the upper leaves, each head approximately 1 cm in diameter, with 6 – 20 flowers; the corollas 5 mm long.

The species is considered to be closely related to B. mendozensis.

== Cultivation ==
The species is not known to be in cultivation.
