= Buddleja longiflora =

Scientific classification
- Kingdom: Plantae
- Clade: Tracheophytes
- Clade: Angiosperms
- Clade: Eudicots
- Clade: Asterids
- Order: Lamiales
- Family: Scrophulariaceae
- Genus: Buddleja
- Species: B. longiflora

Binomial name
- Buddleja longiflora Brade

Species of flowering plant

Buddleja longiflora is a rare species of flowering plant in the family Scrophulariaceae. It is endemic to one small area of Brazil, growing in fields high on the Serra do Caparaó at an altitude of 2400 m. The species was first described and named by Brade in 1957.

== Description ==
Buddleja longiflora is a shrub 0.5 – 1 m high. The young branches are densely tomentose, bearing lanceolate leaves 10 – 17 cm long by 1.2 – 2.7 cm wide, glabrescent above, tomentose below, with petioles 1 – 2.5 cm long. The yellowish orange inflorescence is < 15 cm long, the flowers borne in paired 3 – 5 flowered cymes. The eponymous long flowers have corollas 35 – 42 mm long by 4 – 5 mm wide.

The species could be mistaken for B. speciosissima found in nearby Itatiaia, but for minor differences in flower and leaf dimensions. It is possible B. longiflora could be classified as a subspecies of the latter should more material be availed for examination.

== Cultivation ==
The species is not known to be in cultivation.
