= B. nitida =

B. nitida may refer to:

- Baphia nitida, the camwood or African sandalwood, a tree species found in Africa
- Bornetella nitida, a marine alga species found in throughout the Pacific Ocean, including Mauritius, Indonesia, Australia and Japan
- Buddleja nitida, a shrub species endemic to much of Central America

== See also ==
- Nitida (disambiguation)
