= Buddleja subcapitata =

Scientific classification
- Kingdom: Plantae
- Clade: Tracheophytes
- Clade: Angiosperms
- Clade: Eudicots
- Clade: Asterids
- Order: Lamiales
- Family: Scrophulariaceae
- Genus: Buddleja
- Species: B. subcapitata

Binomial name
- Buddleja subcapitata E. D. Liu

Species of plant

Buddleja subcapitata is a small shrub discovered in 2003 by Liu and Peng in Sichuan, China, growing alongside a road bordering forest in Yanbian County at an elevation of 2,200 m. First described in 2004, this putative species was not included in Leeuwenberg's study of Asiatic and African buddleja published in 1979.

== Description ==
Buddleja subcapitata grows to 1.5 m in height in the wild. The branchlets are quadrangular and densely tomentose, the bark of old branches peeling and often glabrescent. The leaves are lanceolate or obovate-lanceolate, 3.5 – 11.0 cm long by 1.1 – 3.1 cm wide, rugose and tomentose above, densely tomentose below. The small terminal inflorescences are erect, compact, capitulum-like panicles comprising many cymes, 1.7 – 2.5 cm long by 1.9 – 2.5 cm wide, with usually two leafy bracts at the base. The lilac flowers are densely packed, the corollas 9 – 10 mm long and densely tomentose outside.

Buddleja subcapitata most closely resembles B. yunnanensis but differs in both flower and leaf morphology.

== Cultivation ==
Buddleja subcapitata is not known to be in cultivation.
