= Buddleja anchoensis =

Scientific classification
- Kingdom: Plantae
- Clade: Tracheophytes
- Clade: Angiosperms
- Clade: Eudicots
- Clade: Asterids
- Order: Lamiales
- Family: Scrophulariaceae
- Genus: Buddleja
- Species: B. anchoensis

Binomial name
- Buddleja anchoensis Kuntze

Species of flowering plant

Buddleja anchoensis is endemic to the Río Piraí between Santa Cruz and the Andean foothills in Bolivia. The species was named by Otto Kuntze in 1898.

== Description ==
Buddleja anchoensis is a dioecious shrub or small tree, 1.5–5 m tall with brownish fissured bark. The young branches are subquadrangular, and covered with a dense white velvet tomentum. The leaves have petioles 3–5 cm long and are membranaceous, the blade lanceolate, 10–23 cm long by 4–8.5 cm wide, initially tomentous above, becoming glabrescent later. The inflorescences are deep yellow, 6–15 cm long by 5–10 cm wide, comprising a terminal globose head with one or two branches below, each bearing a dichasium of heads 2–2.5 cm in diameter, each with 40–60 flowers. The corollas 2–2.5 mm long.

== Cultivation ==
The species is not known to be in cultivation.

== Etymology ==
The shrub is named for the Río Piraí village of Puerto Ancho.
