= Buddleja chapalana =

Scientific classification
- Kingdom: Plantae
- Clade: Embryophytes
- Clade: Tracheophytes
- Clade: Spermatophytes
- Clade: Angiosperms
- Clade: Eudicots
- Clade: Asterids
- Order: Lamiales
- Family: Scrophulariaceae
- Genus: Buddleja
- Species: B. chapalana

Binomial name
- Buddleja chapalana B. L. Rob.

Species of flowering plant

Buddleja chapalana is a rare species endemic to the rocky cliffs bordering the northern and western shores of Lake Chapala, Jalisco, Mexico. The shrub grows in shade amidst deciduous woodland at an altitude of 1750–2500 m. B. chapalana was first described and named by Robinson in 1891.

== Description ==
Buddleja chapalana is a small dioecious shrub 0.3 – 2.5 m high, with light grey-brown rimose bark. The young branches are terete, woolly and floccose, bearing thin, membranaceous sessile rhomboid leaves, 3–7.5 cm long by 1.5–3.5 cm wide, woolly and floccose on both surfaces. The yellow inflorescences are 3–10 cm long, comprising 3–6 pairs of globose heads around 1 cm in diameter subtended by small leaves, each head with 15–20 flowers; the corolla tubes are 2–2.5 mm long.

== Cultivation ==
The shrub is not known to be in cultivation.
