= Buddleja euryphylla =

Scientific classification
- Kingdom: Plantae
- Clade: Tracheophytes
- Clade: Angiosperms
- Clade: Eudicots
- Clade: Asterids
- Order: Lamiales
- Family: Scrophulariaceae
- Genus: Buddleja
- Species: B. euryphylla

Binomial name
- Buddleja euryphylla Standl. & Steyerm.

Species of plant

Buddleja euryphylla is a species endemic to cloud forest in El Salvador, Guatemala and Honduras; it was first described and named by Standley and Steyermark in 1947.

== Description ==
Buddleja euryphylla is a dioecious tree 8–15 m high, and closely related to B. cordata. The young branches are quadrangular, tomentose only at the apex. The ovate to ovate elliptic leaves have 3–7 cm petioles, and are 15–27 cm long by 8–16 cm wide, glabrous above, tomentose below. The yellow inflorescences are 20–30 cm long by 20–30 cm wide, paniculate with three to four orders of leafy-bracted branches, bearing short cymules each 0.4–0.6 cm in diameter with usually three flowers; the corolla tubes are 2–2.5 mm long.

== Cultivation ==
The species is not known to be in cultivation.
