= Buddleja oblonga =

Scientific classification
- Kingdom: Plantae
- Clade: Tracheophytes
- Clade: Angiosperms
- Clade: Eudicots
- Clade: Asterids
- Order: Lamiales
- Family: Scrophulariaceae
- Genus: Buddleja
- Species: B. oblonga

Binomial name
- Buddleja oblonga Benth.

Synonyms
- Buddleja lythroides Kraenzl.

Species of flowering plant

Buddleja oblonga is a species endemic to the Serra do Caparaó and south as far as Paraná in Brazil, where it grows in fields and damp thickets near streams at altitudes of 1,000 – 2,200 m. The species was first named and described by Bentham in 1846.

== Description ==
Buddleja oblonga is a dioecious shrub with dark-brown longitudinally fissured bark. The young branches are quadrangular, bearing sessile oblong to elliptic membranaceous leaves 6 – 15 cm long by 0.8 – 3 cm wide, glabrous above and glabrescent below. The white inflorescences are 4 – 10 cm long, comprising 4 – 8 heads in the axils of the reduced terminal leaves, the heads 0.7 – 1.5 cm in diameter, with 5 – 9 flowers; the corollas 4.5 – 5.5 mm long.
