= Buddleja acuminata =

Scientific classification
- Kingdom: Plantae
- Clade: Embryophytes
- Clade: Tracheophytes
- Clade: Spermatophytes
- Clade: Angiosperms
- Clade: Eudicots
- Clade: Asterids
- Order: Lamiales
- Family: Scrophulariaceae
- Genus: Buddleja
- Species: B. acuminata

Binomial name
- Buddleja acuminata Poir.

Synonyms
- Adenoplea baccata Radlk.; Adenoplea baroniana (Oliv.) Petit; Adenoplea sinuata (Willd.) Radlk.; Buddleja candelabrum Kränzl.; Buddleja poiretii Spreng.; Buddleja sinuata Willd. ex Roem. et Schult.; Nicodemia baroniana Oliv.

Species of flowering plant

Buddleja acuminata is a rare shrub endemic to the northern half of Madagascar and eastern Zaire, where it grows along forest edges and in clearings at elevations of 50–800 m. The species was first named and described by Poiret in 1810.

== Description ==
Buddleja acuminata is a sarmentose, often lianescent, shrub 1.5–3 m in height, with stellate-tomentose branchlets. The opposite dark green leaves have petioles 0.7–2 cm long, the blades variable in shape, from triangular to narrowly ovate, 5–11 cm long by 1.5–6.5 cm wide, long-acuminate at the apex, subcordate to cuneate at the base, all but glabrous above, stellate - tomentose below; the margins range from coarsely dentate at the base, to entire and covered by a thick felt-like indumentum. The inflorescences are white panicles, initially small and congested < 2 cm in diameter at anthesis, enlarging to 15 cm long by 6 cm, the corollas 9–13 mm long.

== Cultivation ==
Buddleja acuminata is not known to be in cultivation.
