= Buddleja iresinoides =

Scientific classification
- Kingdom: Plantae
- Clade: Tracheophytes
- Clade: Angiosperms
- Clade: Eudicots
- Clade: Asterids
- Order: Lamiales
- Family: Scrophulariaceae
- Genus: Buddleja
- Species: B. iresinoides

Binomial name
- Buddleja iresinoides (Griseb.) Hosseus

Synonyms
- Buddleja microcephala Rusby; Buddleja pendula R. E. Fr.; Buddleja pendula R. E. Fr. var. concolor L. B. Smith; Buddleja similis R. E. Fr.; Lippia iresinoides Griseb.

Species of flowering plant

Buddleja iresinoides is a species of flowering plant in the family Scrophulariaceae. It is endemic to the rocky hillsides and stream banks of Bolivia and northern Argentina at altitudes from 300 to 1500 m. The species was correctly identified as a Buddleja and named by Hosseus in 1924.

== Description ==
Buddleja iresinoides is a dioecious shrub 1 – 3 m, occasionally < 5 m, high with light grey finely-striated bark. The pendulous branches are subquadrangular, tomentulose or tomentose, bearing lanceolate to ovate leaves 5 – 15 cm long by 2 – 5 cm wide on 0.5 – 1.5 cm petioles, glabrous above and tomentose, tomentulose, or even glabrescent below. The cream inflorescence is paniculate, 10 – 15 cm long with two orders of branches, the flowers borne in small globose heads 4 – 6 mm in diameter and comprising 3 – 12 flowers. The corolla is < 2 mm long and of differing shape depending on the sex of the plant, which led Fries to mistakenly identify two separate species (see Synonyms).

== Cultivation ==
The shrub is not known to be in cultivation.
