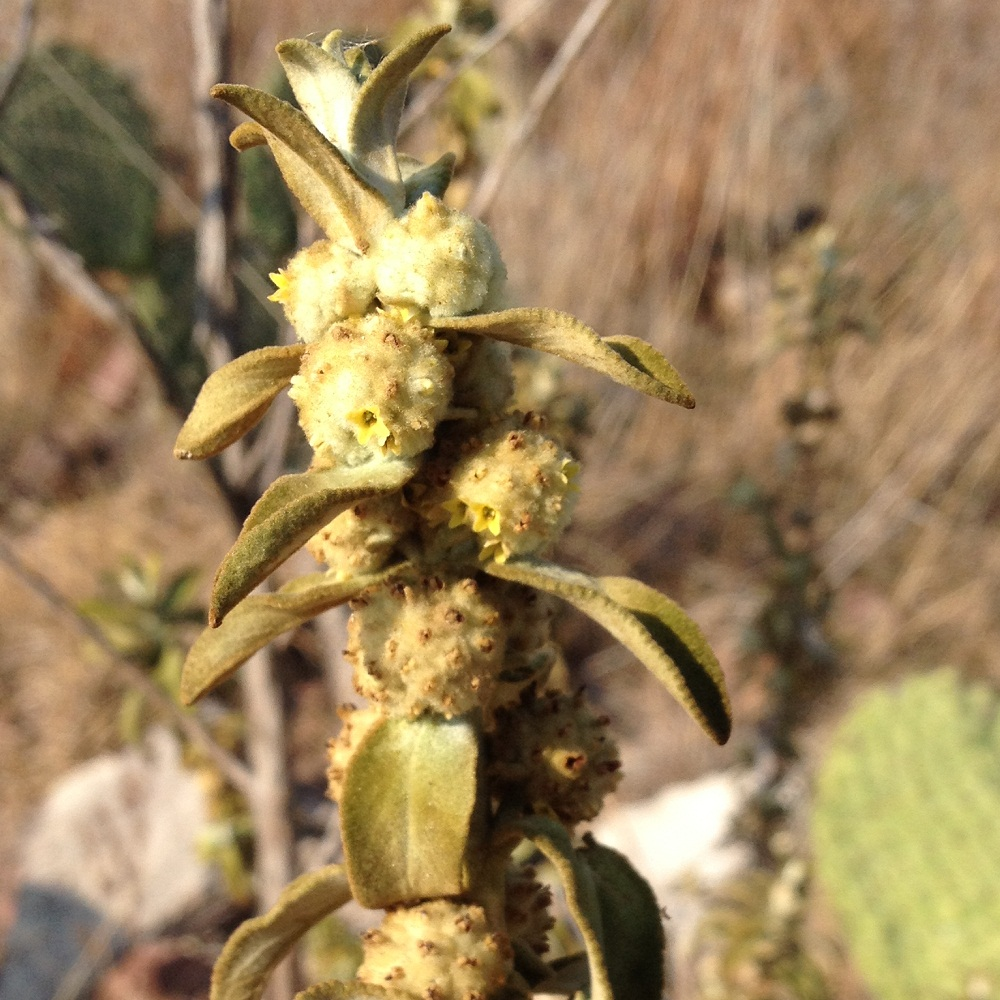

Scientific classification
- Kingdom: Plantae
- Clade: Embryophytes
- Clade: Tracheophytes
- Clade: Spermatophytes
- Clade: Angiosperms
- Clade: Eudicots
- Clade: Asterids
- Order: Lamiales
- Family: Scrophulariaceae
- Genus: Buddleja
- Species: B. perfoliata

Binomial name
- Buddleja perfoliata Kunth

Synonyms
- Buddleja sphaerantha Schltdl. & Cham.

= Buddleja perfoliata =

Species of flowering plant

Buddleja perfoliata is endemic to the xerophytic and subzerophytic grasslands of central Mexico at elevations of 1500 – 2700 m. The species was first named and described by Kunth in 1818.

== Description ==
Buddleja perfoliata is a small dioecious shrub 0.8 – 2 m tall in the wild, much branched, and with a greyish-black shredding bark. The young branches are subquadrangular and tomentose, bearing sessile lanceolate to elliptic opposite subcoriaceous leaves, rugose above with dense felt-like tomentum covering both surfaces. The yellow inflorescences, redolent of sage, are 5 – 25 cm long, comprising 5 – 26 pairs of heads borne in the axils of the leaves, each head about 1 cm in diameter with 30 – 40 flowers. Ploidy: 2n = 38.

== Cultivation ==
The species is not known to be in cultivation.
