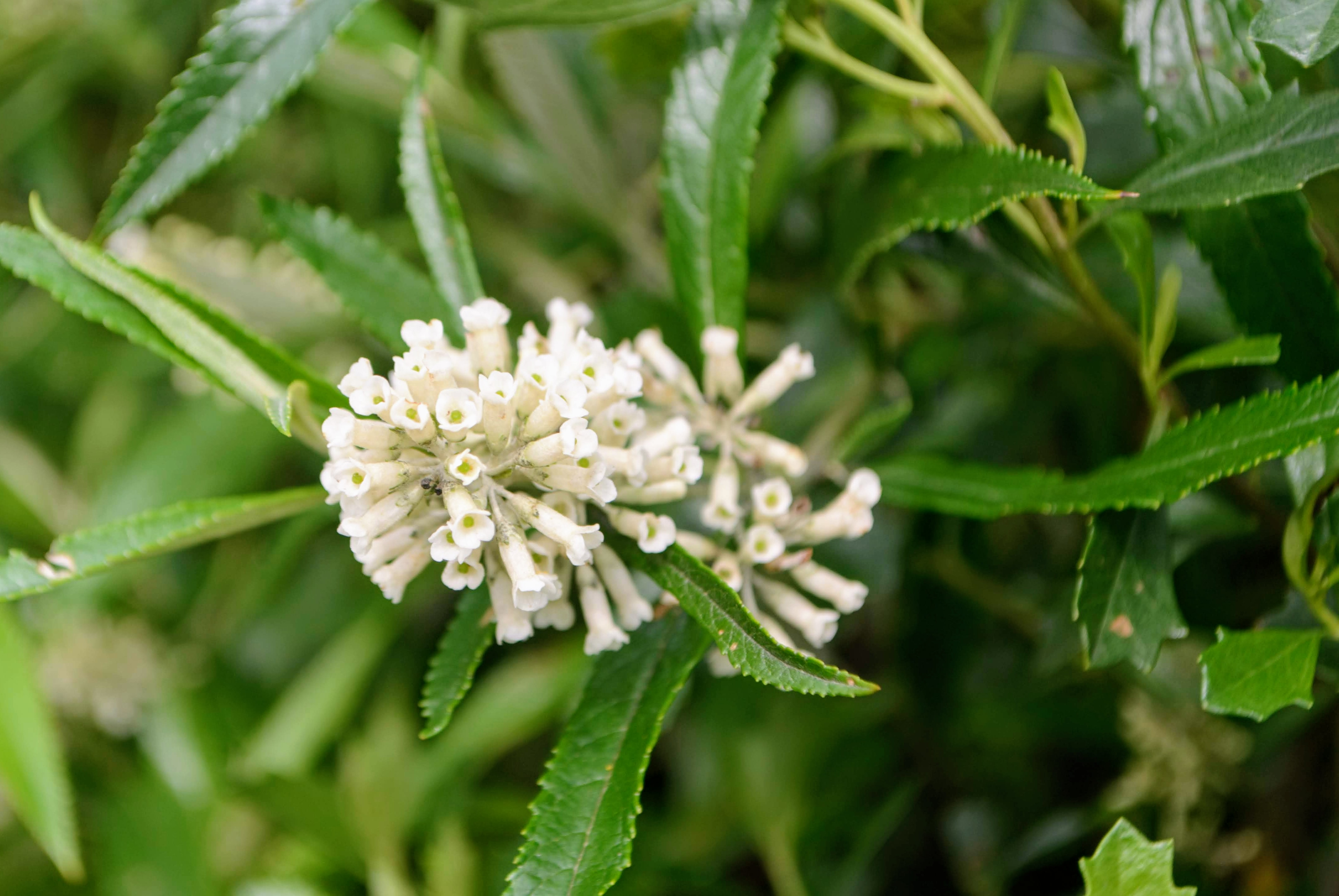

Scientific classification
- Kingdom: Plantae
- Clade: Embryophytes
- Clade: Tracheophytes
- Clade: Spermatophytes
- Clade: Angiosperms
- Clade: Eudicots
- Clade: Asterids
- Order: Lamiales
- Family: Scrophulariaceae
- Genus: Buddleja
- Species: B. thyrsoides

Binomial name
- Buddleja thyrsoides Lam.

= Buddleja thyrsoides =

Species of flowering plant

Buddleja thyrsoides is a lowland species endemic from southern Paraguay to the deltas of the Río de la Plata and Paraná River in Brazil, Argentina and Uruguay. The species was first described and named by Lamarck in 1792.

== Description ==
Buddleja thyrsoides is a dioecious shrub 1 – 3. m tall, with tan bark, the young branches covered with white tomentum. The leaves are sessile or subsessile, linear or linear-lanceolate, the blade 7 – 15 cm long by 0.4 – 3 cm wide, subcoriaceous, glabrescent above, and white tomentose below. The fragrant white leafy inflorescences are 5 – 15 cm long by 2 – 3 cm wide, comprising 1 – 2 orders of branches, 0.5 – 2 cm long with cymose clusters of 5 – 15 flowers; the tubular corollas 3 – 4 mm long.

== Subspecies ==
Norman identifies two subspecies distinguished by narrower seeds and denser tomentum resp.:

- Buddleja thyrsoides subsp. angusticarpa
- Buddleja thyrsoides subsp. thyrsoides (synonyms= Buddleja chloroleuca Kraenzl., Buddleja salicifolia Vahl.)

== Cultivation ==
Neither the species nor its subspecies are known to be in cultivation.
