= Buddleja bhutanica =

Scientific classification
- Kingdom: Plantae
- Clade: Embryophytes
- Clade: Tracheophytes
- Clade: Spermatophytes
- Clade: Angiosperms
- Clade: Eudicots
- Clade: Asterids
- Order: Lamiales
- Family: Scrophulariaceae
- Genus: Buddleja
- Species: B. bhutanica

Binomial name
- Buddleja bhutanica T. Yamaz.

Species of flowering plant

Buddleja bhutanica is a species of flowering shrub endemic to Bhutan, where it grows in bush on mountain slopes at elevations around 1,700 m. The shrub was first described and named by Yamazaki in 1971.

== Description ==
Buddleja bhutanica is a deciduous shrub 1.5–2 m in height, very similar to B. asiatica but distinguished by its perfoliate leaves. The branchlets are terete and glabrous, bearing opposite leaves, connate-perfoliate and narrowly oblong, 6–16 cm long by 3–8 cm wide, glabrous above and below, the margins serrate or entire. The white, very fragrant inflorescences comprise terminal panicles, 8–17 cm long by 3–8 cm wide, the corollas 4.5–5.5 mm long.

== Cultivation ==
Buddleja bhutanica is not hardy in the UK; attempts at introduction, at the Chelsea Physic Garden and the Teignmouth Orangery, both failed. Hardiness: USDA zone 9.
