= Buddleja chenopodiifolia =

Scientific classification
- Kingdom: Plantae
- Clade: Embryophytes
- Clade: Tracheophytes
- Clade: Spermatophytes
- Clade: Angiosperms
- Clade: Eudicots
- Clade: Asterids
- Order: Lamiales
- Family: Scrophulariaceae
- Genus: Buddleja
- Species: B. chenopodiifolia

Binomial name
- Buddleja chenopodiifolia Kraenzl.

Species of plant

Buddleja chenopodiifolia is a species endemic to the dry rocky or clay hillsides of southern Peru at altitudes of 2200–3100 m; it was first described and named by Kraenzlin in 1913.

== Description ==
Buddleja chenopodiifolia is a dioecious shrub 1–2 m high, with dark brown fissured bark. The branches are subquadrangular and covered with a dense white tomentum. The membranaceous ovate leaves have 0.5–1 cm petioles, and are 4–8 cm long by 1.3–3.5 cm wide, glabrescent above but with white tomentum below. The yellowish-white leafy-bracted inflorescences are 10–20 cm long, comprising 6–14 pairs of globose heads < 1 cm in diameter, each head with 6–20 flowers; the corolla tubes are 1.7–2.5 mm long.

== Cultivation ==
The shrub is not known to be in cultivation.
