= Buddleja hieronymi =

Scientific classification
- Kingdom: Plantae
- Clade: Tracheophytes
- Clade: Angiosperms
- Clade: Eudicots
- Clade: Asterids
- Order: Lamiales
- Family: Scrophulariaceae
- Genus: Buddleja
- Species: B. hieronymi

Binomial name
- Buddleja hieronymi R.E.Fr.

Synonyms
- Buddleja misera Kraenzl.

Species of flowering plant

Buddleja hieronymi is a species endemic to southern Bolivia and northern Argentina first described and named by Fries in 1905.

== Description ==
Buddleja hieronymi is a dioecious shrub 1 – 1.5 m high with greyish rimose bark. The old naked branches often persist, while the youngest branches are tomentulose, bearing small oblong subsessile leaves 0.5 – 3 cm long by 0.4 – 1 cm wide, membranaceous or subcoriaceous, tomentulose to glabrescent above, and tomentose below. The yellowish-white inflorescence comprises one globose head 0.5 – 0.7 cm in diameter formed by 6 – 9 flowers, with occasionally a pair of smaller heads below. The tubular corolla is 2.5 – 3 mm long.

== Cultivation ==
The shrub is not known to be in cultivation.
