= Buddleja scordioides =

Conservation status
- Secure (NatureServe)

Scientific classification
- Kingdom: Plantae
- Clade: Tracheophytes
- Clade: Angiosperms
- Clade: Eudicots
- Clade: Asterids
- Order: Lamiales
- Family: Scrophulariaceae
- Genus: Buddleja
- Species: B. scordioides

Binomial name
- Buddleja scordioides Kunth

Synonyms
- Buddleja scordioides Kunth var. capitata Watson

Species of flowering plant

Buddleja scordioides is endemic to central Arizona, southeastern New Mexico, southwestern Texas, and the Chihuahua Desert of Mexico, growing amidst xeric thorn-scrub on alkaline soils at elevations of 600–2,500 m (1,970–8,200 ft). The species was first named and described by Kunth in 1818.

== Description ==
Buddleja scordioides is a weedy dioecious shrub 0.3–1.2 m (1 ft 0 in – 3 ft 11 in) tall with shredding bark. The young branches are subquadrangular and tomentose, bearing small oblong to linear membranaceous grayish-green leaves 1–3 cm (0.39–1.18 in) long by 0.3–0.8 cm (0.12–0.31 in) wide, rugose above, and tomentose on both surfaces. The sage-scented lemon-yellow leafy inflorescences are 2–10 cm (0.79–3.94 in) long, comprising 3 – 15 pairs of sessile clusters, each with 15 – 20 flowers, the corollas 1.5 – 2 mm long. Ploidy: 2n = 38.

== Cultivation ==
The species is not known to be in cultivation.
