= Buddleja fragifera =

Conservation status
- Vulnerable (IUCN 3.1)

Scientific classification
- Kingdom: Plantae
- Clade: Tracheophytes
- Clade: Angiosperms
- Clade: Eudicots
- Clade: Asterids
- Order: Lamiales
- Family: Scrophulariaceae
- Genus: Buddleja
- Species: B. fragifera

Binomial name
- Buddleja fragifera Leeuwenb.

Species of flowering plant

Buddleja fragifera is a rare evergreen shrub endemic to the southern tip of Madagascar, where it grows amongst scrub near the coast. The species was first named and described by Leeuwenberg in 1975.

== Description ==
Buddleja fragifera is a shrub 2–3 m in height, with stellate-pubescent branchlets. The opposite leaves have petioles 0.4–1 cm long, the blade ovate to elliptic, 0.8–3 cm long by 0.5–2.4 cm wide, obtuse or rounded at the apex, and subcordate to cuneate at the base, and covered by a thick felt-like indumentum. The dark yellow to orange flowers are sessile, the corollas 6–7.5 mm long.

== Range and habitat ==
Buddlejea fragifera is native to southern and southwestern Madagascar, where it is found near the coast in Anosy and Androy regions (formerly Toliara Province) from sea level up to 200 meters elevation. It is known from only five widely-scatterered locations.

Its habitat includes subarid bushland, low dense scrub on sand, and littoral forest.

It is threatened by habitat destruction from human-set fires, livestock grazing, mining, and deforestation.

== Cultivation ==
Buddleja fragifera is not known to be in cultivation.
