= Buddleja pulchella =

Scientific classification
- Kingdom: Plantae
- Clade: Embryophytes
- Clade: Tracheophytes
- Clade: Spermatophytes
- Clade: Angiosperms
- Clade: Eudicots
- Clade: Asterids
- Order: Lamiales
- Family: Scrophulariaceae
- Genus: Buddleja
- Species: B. pulchella

Binomial name
- Buddleja pulchella N.E.Br.

Species of flowering plant

Buddleja pulchella is endemic to the open mountain forest of South Africa, Zimbabwe, Kenya and Tanzania at elevations of 1,200 – 2,000 m. The species was first named and described by N. E. Brown in 1894.

== Description ==
Buddleja pulchella is a sprawling shrub or tree less than 10 m tall and up to twice as wide. The leaves are opposite or sub-opposite with petioles 5–10 mm long. The sweetly scented flowers are white or pale cream with orange throats, and borne in lax terminal panicles.

== Cultivation ==
The species was introduced to the UK from the Durban Botanic Garden in 1894, but is not known to remain in cultivation. Hardiness: USDA zones 8–9.
