= Buddleja tucumanensis =

Scientific classification
- Kingdom: Plantae
- Clade: Embryophytes
- Clade: Tracheophytes
- Clade: Spermatophytes
- Clade: Angiosperms
- Clade: Eudicots
- Clade: Asterids
- Order: Lamiales
- Family: Scrophulariaceae
- Genus: Buddleja
- Species: B. tucumanensis

Binomial name
- Buddleja tucumanensis Griseb.

Synonyms
- Buddleja bangii Kraenzl.; Buddleja canescens Rusby; Buddleja cochabambensis Rusby; Buddleja hypoleuca Kraenzl.; Buddleja ignea Kraenzl.; Buddleja inconspicua Kraenzl.; Buddleja tucumanensis Griseb. var. serrata Griseb.

Species of flowering plant

Buddleja tucumanensis is a species of flowering plant in the family Scrophulariaceae. It is endemic to the La Paz Department of Bolivia and to the Catamarca Province of Argentina, growing on rocky hillsides, along streams and roads from sea level to 3,300 m. The species was first named and described by Grisebach in 1874.

== Description ==
Buddleja tucumanensis is a dioecious shrub 0.5 – 5 m in height, with grey fissured bark. The young branches are terete and covered with tomentum. The lower leaves have petioles < 2 cm long, and blades oblong to ovate, 8 – 15 cm long by 2.5 – 5.5 cm wide, subcoriaceous, glabrescent above, tomentose or lanose below, the margin serrate. The upper leaves have shorter petioles, and the blades lanceolate to elliptic 3 – 11 cm long by 1 – 4 cm wide, the margin entire. The yellowish-orange leafy inflorescences comprise hemispheric heads in the axils of the terminal leaves, 5 – 20 heads per branch, each head 1 – 1.5 cm in diameter with 5 – 20 flowers; the corollas 3.5 – 5 mm long. Ploidy: 2n = 38.

== Cultivation ==
Buddleja tucumanensis is not known to be in cultivation beyond Argentina.
