= Buddleja misionum =

Scientific classification
- Kingdom: Plantae
- Clade: Embryophytes
- Clade: Tracheophytes
- Clade: Spermatophytes
- Clade: Angiosperms
- Clade: Eudicots
- Clade: Asterids
- Order: Lamiales
- Family: Scrophulariaceae
- Genus: Buddleja
- Species: B. misionum

Binomial name
- Buddleja misionum Kraenzl.

Species of flowering plant

Buddleja misionum is a species endemic to dry rocky fields and roadsides in southern Paraguay, the Rio Grande do Sul in Brazil, and the provinces of Corrientes and Misiones in Argentina; it was first described and named by Kraenzlin in 1913.

== Description ==
Buddleja misionum is a dioecious shrub 1 – 2 m high, with tan fissured bark. The branches are subquadrangular and covered with a dense tomentum. The sessile lanceolate to elliptic leaves are 5.5 – 10 cm long by 1.4 – 4 cm wide, lanose above and below. The yellow inflorescences are 15 – 30 cm long, comprising 5 – 15 pairs of heads 1 – 1.5 cm in diameter located in the axils of the terminal leaves, each head with > 20 flowers; the corolla tubes 4.5 – 5 mm long.

== Cultivation ==
The shrub is not known to be in cultivation.
