= Buddleja fusca =

Scientific classification
- Kingdom: Plantae
- Clade: Tracheophytes
- Clade: Angiosperms
- Clade: Eudicots
- Clade: Asterids
- Order: Lamiales
- Family: Scrophulariaceae
- Genus: Buddleja
- Species: B. fusca

Binomial name
- Buddleja fusca Baker

Species of flowering plant

Buddleja fusca is a species of flowering plant in the figwort family, Scrophulariaceae that is endemic to Madagascar. It grows along forest edges or in thickets at altitudes of 1,500–2,500 m. The species was named and described in 1884 by Baker.

== Description ==
Buddleja fusca is a shrub 1–3 m in height, the branchlets nearly terete, bearing opposite, petiolate dark green leaves highly variable in shape and size, but generally small, elliptic to ovate, 1–4.5 cm long by 0.5–2.2 cm wide, acuminate to rounded at the apex, cuneate to truncate at the base; the margins irregularly serrate - dentate to repand - dentate to entire. The yellow to orange inflorescences comprise terminal and axillary thyrsoids, 1.5–6 cm long by 1.5–2 cm wide; the corollas 8–11 mm long.

== Cultivation ==
Buddleja fusca is not known to be in cultivation.
