= Buddleja ibarrensis =

Conservation status
- Endangered (IUCN 3.1)

Scientific classification
- Kingdom: Plantae
- Clade: Tracheophytes
- Clade: Angiosperms
- Clade: Eudicots
- Clade: Asterids
- Order: Lamiales
- Family: Scrophulariaceae
- Genus: Buddleja
- Species: B. ibarrensis

Binomial name
- Buddleja ibarrensis Norman

Species of flowering plant

Buddleja ibarrensis is an endangered species endemic to a small area of Ecuador in the vicinity of Ibarra in subtropical or tropical moist montane forest at an elevation of 2,200 m threatened by deforestation. B. ibarrensis was first described and named by Norman.

== Description ==
Buddleja ibarrensis is a shrub closely related to B. americana. The young branches are subquadrangular and tomentose, bearing elliptic leaves 8 – 15 cm long by 3.7 – 9 cm wide on 2 – 3 cm petioles membranaceous, glabrescent above, and tomentose below. The white or cream inflorescence 10 – 20 cm long by 7 – 18 cm wide comprises two or three orders of branches bearing cymules 1 – 2 cm in diameter each with 5 – 15 flowers. The funnelform corolla is 3.5 – 4 mm long.

== Cultivation ==
The shrub is not known to be in cultivation.
