= Buddleja skutchii =

Scientific classification
- Kingdom: Plantae
- Clade: Embryophytes
- Clade: Tracheophytes
- Clade: Spermatophytes
- Clade: Angiosperms
- Clade: Eudicots
- Clade: Asterids
- Order: Lamiales
- Family: Scrophulariaceae
- Genus: Buddleja
- Species: B. skutchii

Binomial name
- Buddleja skutchii C. V. Morton

Species of plant

Buddleja skutchii is endemic to much of the sierras of Central America, growing mostly in pine-oak forest, also in cloud forest, and in shrubby secondary growth. The species was first named and described by Morton in 1935.

== Description ==
Buddleja skutchii is a dioecious tree 5 – 25 m tall, with brown to blackish fissured bark. The young branches are quadrangular and tomentose, bearing lanceolate to ovate-lanceolate leaves 6 – 20 cm long by 2 – 10 cm wide, membranaceous to subcoriaceous, glabrescent above, below with adpressed indumentum, the margins entire. The yellow to orange paniculate leafy-bracted inflorescences are 8 – 15 cm long by 8 – 20 cm wide, comprising 3 – 4 orders of branches bearing small cymules 0.4 – 0.6 cm in diameter, each with 3 – 15 flowers. Ploidy: 2n = 76.

== Cultivation ==
The species is grown at the San Francisco Botanical Garden in San Francisco and in France at Le Jardin de Rochevieille.

== Subspecies ==
Two subspecies have been identified by Norman:

- Buddleja skutchii C. V. Morton subsp. skutchii E. M. Norman (syn. Buddleja matudae Standl.)
- Buddleja skutchii C. V. Morton subsp. costaricensis E. M. Norman
