= Buddleja parviflora =

Scientific classification
- Kingdom: Plantae
- Clade: Embryophytes
- Clade: Tracheophytes
- Clade: Spermatophytes
- Clade: Angiosperms
- Clade: Eudicots
- Clade: Asterids
- Order: Lamiales
- Family: Scrophulariaceae
- Genus: Buddleja
- Species: B. parviflora

Binomial name
- Buddleja parviflora Kunth

Synonyms
- Buddleja abbreviata Kunth; Buddleja brevifolia Willd. ex Schultes & Schultes; Buddleja gracilis Kunth; Buddleja intermedia Kunth; Buddleja lanceolata Benth.; Buddleja ligustrina Loes.; Buddleja microphylla Kunth; Buddleja monticola Loes.; Buddleja obtusifolia Martens & Galeotti; Buddleja venusta Kunth

Species of flowering plant

Buddleja parviflora is large dioecious shrub or small tree endemic to much of upland Mexico north of the Isthmus of Tehuantepec, in forests at elevations of 750 – 3500 m. The species was first named and described by Kunth in 1818.

== Description ==
Buddleja parviflora grows to a height of <10 m in the wild, with a trunk < 20 cm in diameter; the bark blackish and exfoliating. The young branches are subquadrangular and tomentose, bearing opposite subcoriaceous leaves of variable shape, 3 – 12 cm long by 1 – 4.5 cm wide. The white to greenish-white inflorescences are paniculate, 3 – 18 cm long by 2 – 12 cm comprising 2 – 3 orders of branches subtended by small leaves and bearing small cymules with 3 – 5 tiny flowers, the campanulate corollas 1 – 1.5 mm long. Ploidy: 2n = 76.

== Cultivation ==
The species is uncommon in cultivation. Hardiness: USDA zones 8–9.
