= Buddleja kleinii =

Scientific classification
- Kingdom: Plantae
- Clade: Embryophytes
- Clade: Tracheophytes
- Clade: Spermatophytes
- Clade: Angiosperms
- Clade: Eudicots
- Clade: Asterids
- Order: Lamiales
- Family: Scrophulariaceae
- Genus: Buddleja
- Species: B. kleinii

Binomial name
- Buddleja kleinii E. M. Norman & L. B. Sm.

Synonyms
- Buddleja campestris subsp. magnicarpa E. M. Norman & L. B. Sm.

Species of flowering plant

Buddleja kleinii is a species endemic to a small area of cloud forest bordering the eastern portion of the Serra Geral of Santa Catarina and the Rio Grande do Sul in Brazil at altitudes of 1200 – 1650 m. The species was named by Norman and Smith in 1976.

== Description ==
Buddleja kleinii is a dioecious shrub 1 – 2.5 m high with dark-brown fissured bark. The young branches are subquadrangular and tomentose, bearing narrowly elliptic leaves 5 – 10 cm long by 1.5 – 3.5 cm wide, mostly on 1.5 – 2 cm petioles but occasionally subsessile; the blade is glabrescent above and tomentose below. The white inflorescence is 6 – 9 cm long by 2 – 4 cm wide, comprising pairs of congested cymes 1.2 – 1.7 cm in diameter, each with 10 – 15 flowers. The corolla is 6 – 6.5 mm long.

== Cultivation ==
The shrub is not known to be in cultivation.
