= Buddleja ramboi =

Scientific classification
- Kingdom: Plantae
- Clade: Tracheophytes
- Clade: Angiosperms
- Clade: Eudicots
- Clade: Asterids
- Order: Lamiales
- Family: Scrophulariaceae
- Genus: Buddleja
- Species: B. ramboi

Binomial name
- Buddleja ramboi L. B. Sm.

Species of flowering plant

Buddleja ramboi is a very rare Brazilian plant species found only in the shrubby or grassy fields of Santa Catarina and Rio Grande do Sul. The species was described and named by Smith in 1955.

== Description ==
Buddleja ramboi is a dioecious shrub < 2 m high, with shredding brownish bark. The young branches are roughly quadrangular and tomentose, bearing small oblanceolate leaves 1.5 – 3 cm long by 0.7 – 1.2 cm wide with tomentose surfaces, more densely below. The white inflorescences are 3 – 8 cm long and comprise lax cymose clusters, sometimes with only 1 or 2 flowers; the corolla tubes are 2.5 – 3.5 mm long.

== Cultivation ==
The shrub is not known to be in cultivation.
