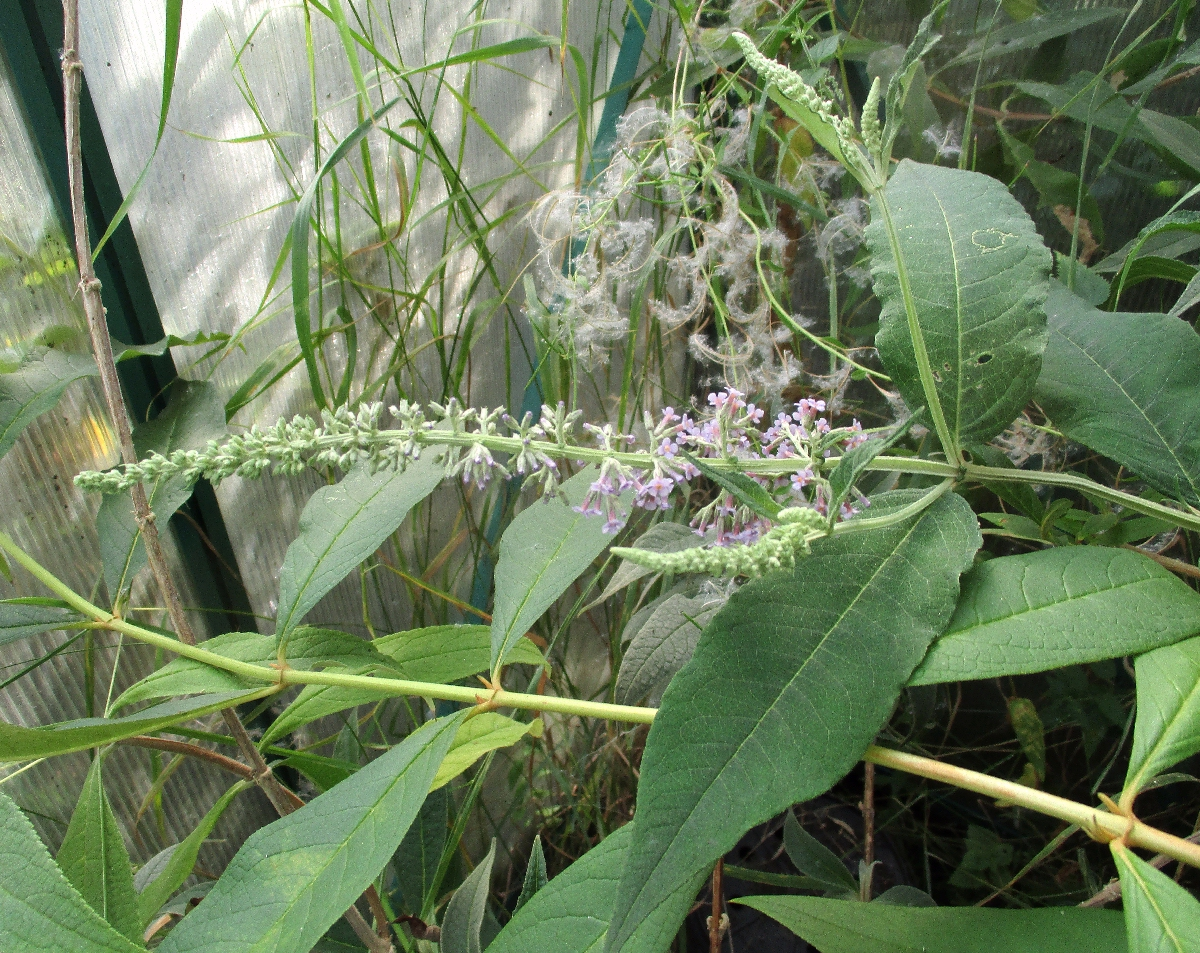
- Inflorescence of Buddleja myriantha from Yunnan

Scientific classification
- Kingdom: Plantae
- Clade: Embryophytes
- Clade: Tracheophytes
- Clade: Spermatophytes
- Clade: Angiosperms
- Clade: Eudicots
- Clade: Asterids
- Order: Lamiales
- Family: Scrophulariaceae
- Genus: Buddleja
- Species: B. myriantha

Binomial name
- Buddleja myriantha Diels

Synonyms
- Buddleja adenantha Diels; Buddleja duclouxii Marquand

= Buddleja myriantha =

Species of plant

Buddleja myriantha is a species endemic to upper Burma and western China, including Tibet, where it grows along forest edges, thickets and streams at altitudes of 2,000 – 3,200 m. The species was first described and named by Diels in 1912.

== Description ==
Buddleja myriantha is deciduous shrub growing 1 – 3 m in height, with subquadrangular, glabrescent branchlets bearing opposite leaves, 5 – 20 cm long by 0.9 – 6 cm wide, narrowly elliptic, acuminate at the apex, cuneate or decurrent at the base, the margins serrate or entire. The often fragrant inflorescences are slender, thyrsoid, almost cylindrical, 6 – 22 cm long by 1.2 – 3 cm wide. The colour of the flowers ranges from purple through violet, to white. The corollas are 5 – 7 mm long. 2n = 76.

Buddleja myriantha most closely resembles Buddleja albiflora, and it can be distinguished by its four-angled stems and tomentose exterior to the corolla tube.

== Cultivation ==
Buddleja myriantha is grown in the UK. A specimen is grown at the Royal Botanic Gardens Edinburgh.

== Suppliers ==
The shrub is purportedly in commerce in the UK and beyond, although the plants in question are not believed to be B. myriantha.
