= Buddleja interrupta =

Scientific classification
- Kingdom: Plantae
- Clade: Tracheophytes
- Clade: Angiosperms
- Clade: Eudicots
- Clade: Asterids
- Order: Lamiales
- Family: Scrophulariaceae
- Genus: Buddleja
- Species: B. interrupta

Binomial name
- Buddleja interrupta Kunth

Synonyms
- Buddleja pilulifera Kraenzl.; Buddleja szyszylowiczii Zahlbr.

Species of plant in Peru

Buddleja interrupta is a species endemic to the dry valleys and roadsides of northern Peru at altitudes < 2600 m. The species was first described and named by Kunth in 1818.

== Description ==
Buddleja interrupta is a dioecious shrub 1 – 2 m high with greyish bark. The young branches are covered with a white tomentum, bearing lanceolate leaves 5 – 12 cm long by 2 – 3 cm wide, subcoriaceous, tomentulose above, white tomentose below. The cream inflorescence is 10 – 20 cm long with two orders of branches, the flowers borne in pairs of capitate sessile cymules 0.5 – 0.8 cm in diameter, each with 3 – 9 flowers. The corolla is < 2 mm long.

== Cultivation ==
The shrub is not known to be in cultivation.
