= Buddleja blattaria =

Scientific classification
- Kingdom: Plantae
- Clade: Tracheophytes
- Clade: Angiosperms
- Clade: Eudicots
- Clade: Asterids
- Order: Lamiales
- Family: Scrophulariaceae
- Genus: Buddleja
- Species: B. blattaria

Binomial name
- Buddleja blattaria J. F. Macbr.

Species of plant

Buddleja blattaria is a small shrub endemic to the regions of Piura and Cajamarca in northern Peru. The species was first described and named by J. F. Macbride in 1934.

== Description ==
Buddleja blattaria is a dioecious shrub, < 1 m tall, with brown fissured bark. The young branches are quadrangular and covered with thick tomentum. The leaves are sessile elliptic or oblong-elliptic, 4–10 cm long by 1.5–3 cm wide, lanose on both surfaces. The white or cream inflorescence is 3–8 cm long, comprising sessile flowers borne on one terminal and 1–3 pairs of globose heads below, in the axils of small leaves, each head 1–2 cm diameter with 20–40 flowers, the corolla 5 mm long.

The species is very similar to B. jamesonii found to the north in southern Ecuador but differs from the latter in having larger leaves with crenate margins, and lacks the foliose axillary branches. B. jamesonii is also trioecious.

== Cultivation ==
The shrub is not known to be in cultivation.
