= Buddleja polycephala =

Scientific classification
- Kingdom: Plantae
- Clade: Embryophytes
- Clade: Tracheophytes
- Clade: Spermatophytes
- Clade: Angiosperms
- Clade: Eudicots
- Clade: Asterids
- Order: Lamiales
- Family: Scrophulariaceae
- Genus: Buddleja
- Species: B. polycephala

Binomial name
- Buddleja polycephala Kunth

Species of plant

Buddleja polycephala is a shrub endemic to southern Ecuador and areas around Ayabaca and Piura, and Cajamarca in Peru, at elevations of 2,000 – 2,700 m. The species was first named and described by Kunth in 1818.

== Description ==
Buddleja polycephala is a dioecious sprawling shrub 1 – 5 m tall. The young branches are quadrangular and tomentose, bearing ovate or ovate-lanceolate membranaceous leaves 9 – 25 cm long by 4 – 10 cm wide, initially thickly tomentose but later glabrescent above, but remaining tomentose below. The yellowish white inflorescences are 15 – 40 cm long, and as wide at the base, with leafy-bracted primary and secondary branches perpendicular to each other. The flowers are borne as compact heads, approximately 1 cm in diameter, each with around 20 flowers, the corollas 3 mm long.

== Cultivation ==
The species is not known to be in cultivation.

== Varieties ==
Norman identifies two varieties, both distinguished by minor differences in the leaves:

- Buddleja polycephala Kunth var. polycephala
- Buddleja polycephala Kunth var. peruviana (J. F. Macbr.) E. M. Norman
