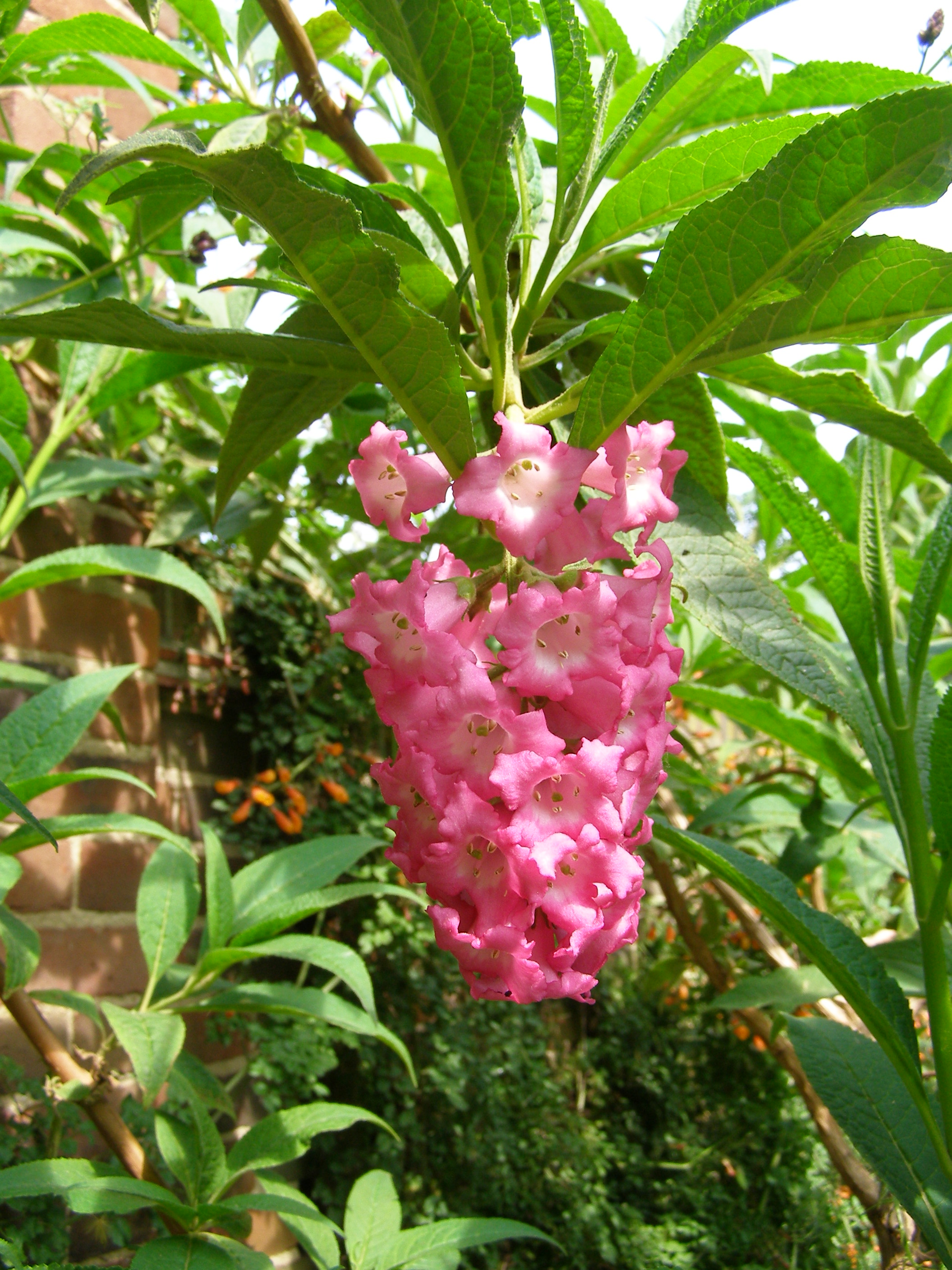

Scientific classification
- Kingdom: Plantae
- Clade: Embryophytes
- Clade: Tracheophytes
- Clade: Spermatophytes
- Clade: Angiosperms
- Clade: Eudicots
- Clade: Asterids
- Order: Lamiales
- Family: Scrophulariaceae
- Genus: Buddleja
- Species: B. colvilei

Binomial name
- Buddleja colvilei Hook.f. & Thomson

= Buddleja colvilei =

Species of flowering plant

Buddleja colvilei is endemic to the eastern Himalaya; discovered by Hooker in 1849, he declared it 'the handsomest of all Himalayan shrubs.' In 1896 the species was awarded the RHS First Class Certificate (FCC), given to plants 'of outstanding excellence for exhibition'.

== Description ==
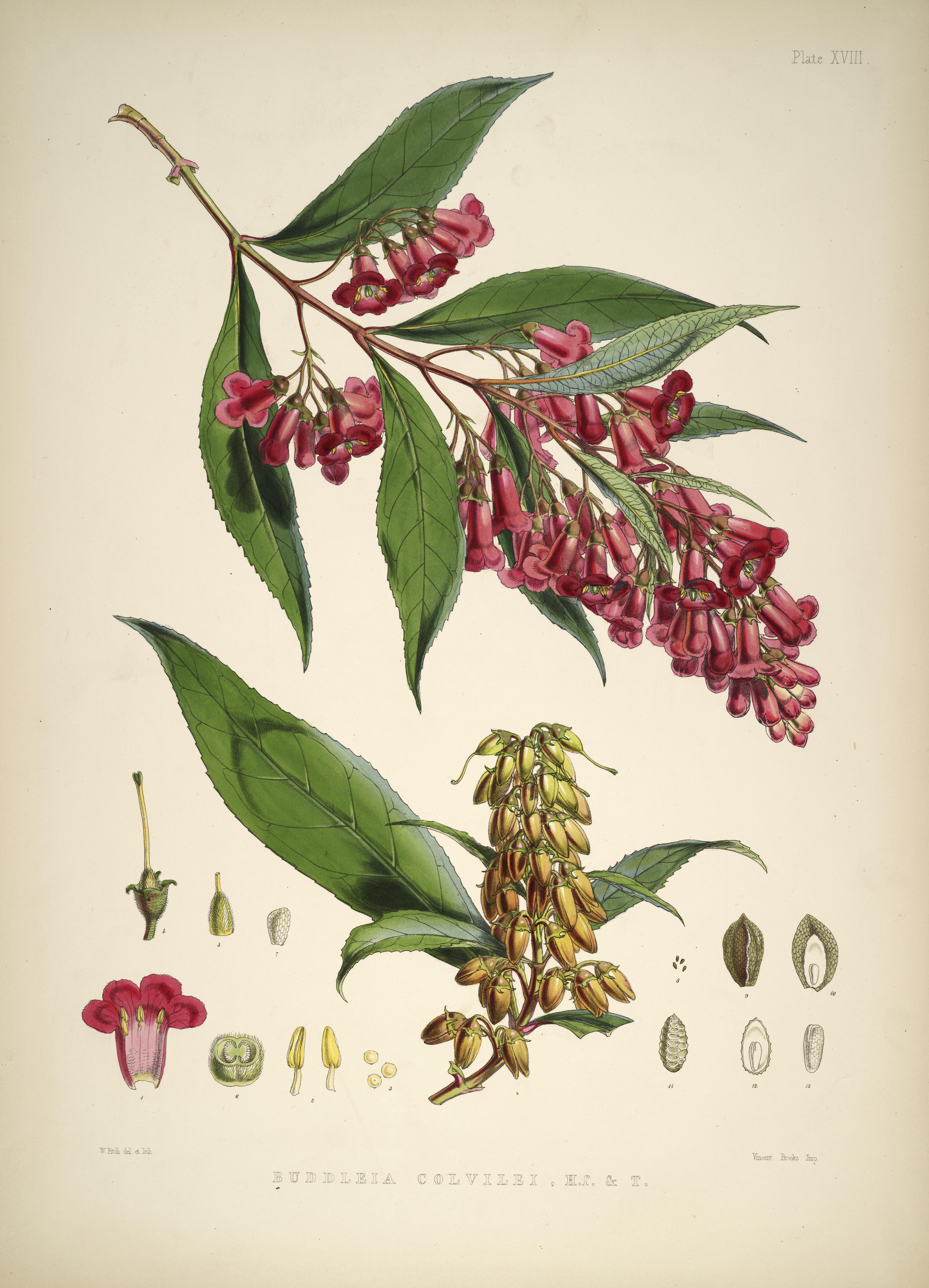
B. colvilei from Illustrations of Himalayan plants.

B. colvilei is a deciduous large shrub or small tree which can grow > 13 m, often single stemmed. The flowers are arranged in drooping panicles, 15–20 cm long by > 8 cm wide, rose pink to crimson, but often white within the corolla tube. The flowers are among the largest of any in the genus, and appear in June. The leaves are < 25 cm long, narrow, shallowly-toothed, and tapered at either end. This species has a high degree of polyploidy with a correspondingly high chromosome number of 2n = 152–456 (8x–24x).

== Cultivation ==
The shrub is not entirely hardy in the UK, and can only be reliably grown outdoors along the Atlantic coast. Hardiness: United States Department of Agriculture zones 8–9.

== Cultivars ==
- Buddleja colvilei 'Kewensis', distinguished by its dark red flowers.
