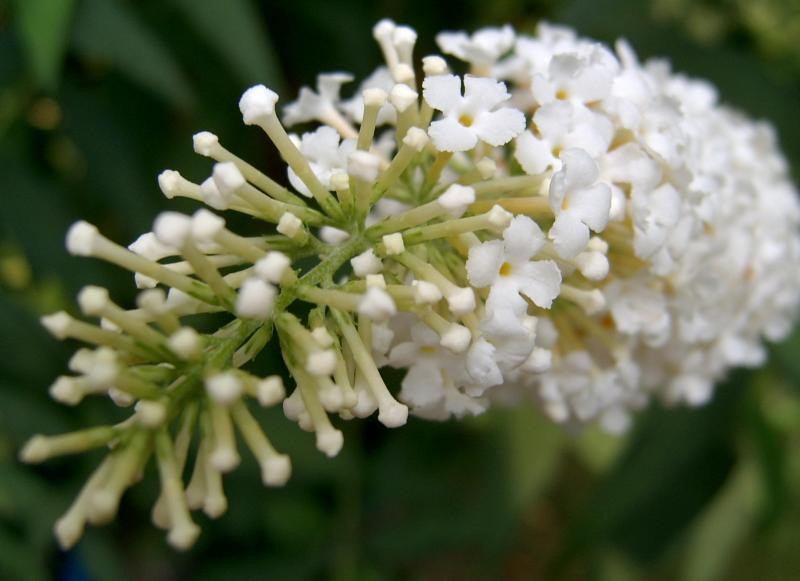
- Buddleja davidii (white flowered form)

Scientific classification
- Kingdom: Plantae
- Clade: Tracheophytes
- Clade: Angiosperms
- Clade: Eudicots
- Clade: Asterids
- Order: Lamiales
- Family: Scrophulariaceae
- Tribe: Buddlejeae
- Genus: Buddleja; L.

Type species
- Buddleja americana L.

Species
- About 140 species, see text.

Synonyms
- Adenoplea Radlk. Adenoplusia Radlk. Buddleia L., orth. var. Chilianthus Burch.

= Buddleja =

Genus of flowering plants

Buddleja (/ˈbʌdliə/; orth. var. Buddleia; also historically given as Buddlea) is a genus comprising over 140 species of flowering plants endemic to Asia, Africa, and the Americas. The generic name bestowed by Linnaeus posthumously honoured Adam Buddle (1662–1715), an English botanist and rector, at the suggestion of William Houstoun. Houstoun sent the first plants to become known to science as buddleja (B. americana) to England from the Caribbean about 15 years after Buddle's death. Buddleja species, especially Buddleja davidii and interspecific hybrids, are commonly known as butterfly bushes and are frequently cultivated as garden shrubs. Buddleja davidii has become an invasive species in both Europe and North America.

== Nomenclature ==
The botanic name has been the source of some confusion. By modern practice of botanical Latin, the spelling of a generic name made from Buddle would be Buddleia, but Linnaeus in his Species Plantarum of 1753 and 1754 spelled it Buddleja, with the long i between two vowels, common in early modern orthography. The pronunciation of the long i in Buddleja as j is a common modern error. The International Code of Botanical Nomenclature has gradually changed to incorporate stricter rules about orthographic variants and as of the 2006 edition requires (article 60, particularly 60.5) that Linnaeus' spelling should be followed in this case.

== Classification ==
The genus Buddleja is now included in Scrophulariaceae, having earlier been classified under Buddlejaceae (synonym: Oftiaceae) and Loganiaceae

== Description ==
Of the approximately 140 species, nearly all are shrubs less than 5 m (16 ft) tall, but a few qualify as trees, the largest reaching 30 m (98 ft). Both evergreen and deciduous species occur, in tropical and temperate regions respectively. The leaves are lanceolate in most species, and arranged in opposite pairs on the stems (alternate in one species, B. alternifolia); they range from 1–30 cm (0.4–11.8 in) long. The flowers of the Asiatic species are mostly produced in terminal panicles 10–50 cm (4–20 in) long; the American species more commonly as cymes forming small, globose heads. Each individual flower is tubular and divided into four spreading lobes (petals) about 3–4 mm (0.12–0.16 in) across, the corolla length ranging from around 10 mm in the Asiatics to 3–30 mm in the American species, the wider variation in the latter because some South American species have evolved long red flowers to attract hummingbirds, rather than insects, as exclusive pollinators.

The colour of the flowers varies widely, from mostly pastel pinks and blues in Asia, to vibrant yellows and reds in the American continent, while many cultivars have deeper tones. The flowers are generally rich in nectar and often strongly honey-scented. The fruit is a small capsule about 1 cm (0.39 in) long and 1–2 mm (0.04–0.08 in) diameter, containing numerous small seeds; in a few species (previously classified in the separate genus Nicodemia) the capsule is soft and fleshy, forming a berry.

== Distribution ==
The genus is found in four continents. Over 60 species are native through the American continent from the southern United States to southern Chile, while many other species are found in Africa, and parts of Asia, but all are absent as natives from Europe and Australasia. The species are divided into three groups based on their floral type: those in the American continent are mostly dioecious (occasionally hermaphrodite or trioecious), while those in the African and in the Asian continent are exclusively hermaphrodite with perfect flowers.

== Cultivation and uses ==
As garden shrubs, buddlejas are essentially 20th-century plants, with the exception of B. globosa which was introduced to Britain from southern Chile in 1774 and disseminated from the nursery of Lee and Kennedy, Hammersmith. Several species such as Buddleja davidii are popular garden plants and are commonly known as "butterfly bushes", owing to their attractiveness to butterflies, and have become staples of the modern butterfly garden; they are also attractive to bees and moths.

The most popular cultivated species is Buddleja davidii from central China, named for the French Basque missionary and naturalist Père Armand David. Other common garden species include the aforementioned B. globosa, grown for its strongly honey-scented orange globular inflorescences, and the weeping Buddleja alternifolia. Several interspecific hybrids have been made, notably B. 'Lochinch' (B. davidii × B. fallowiana) and B. × weyeriana (B. globosa × B. davidii), the latter a cross between a South American and an Asiatic species.

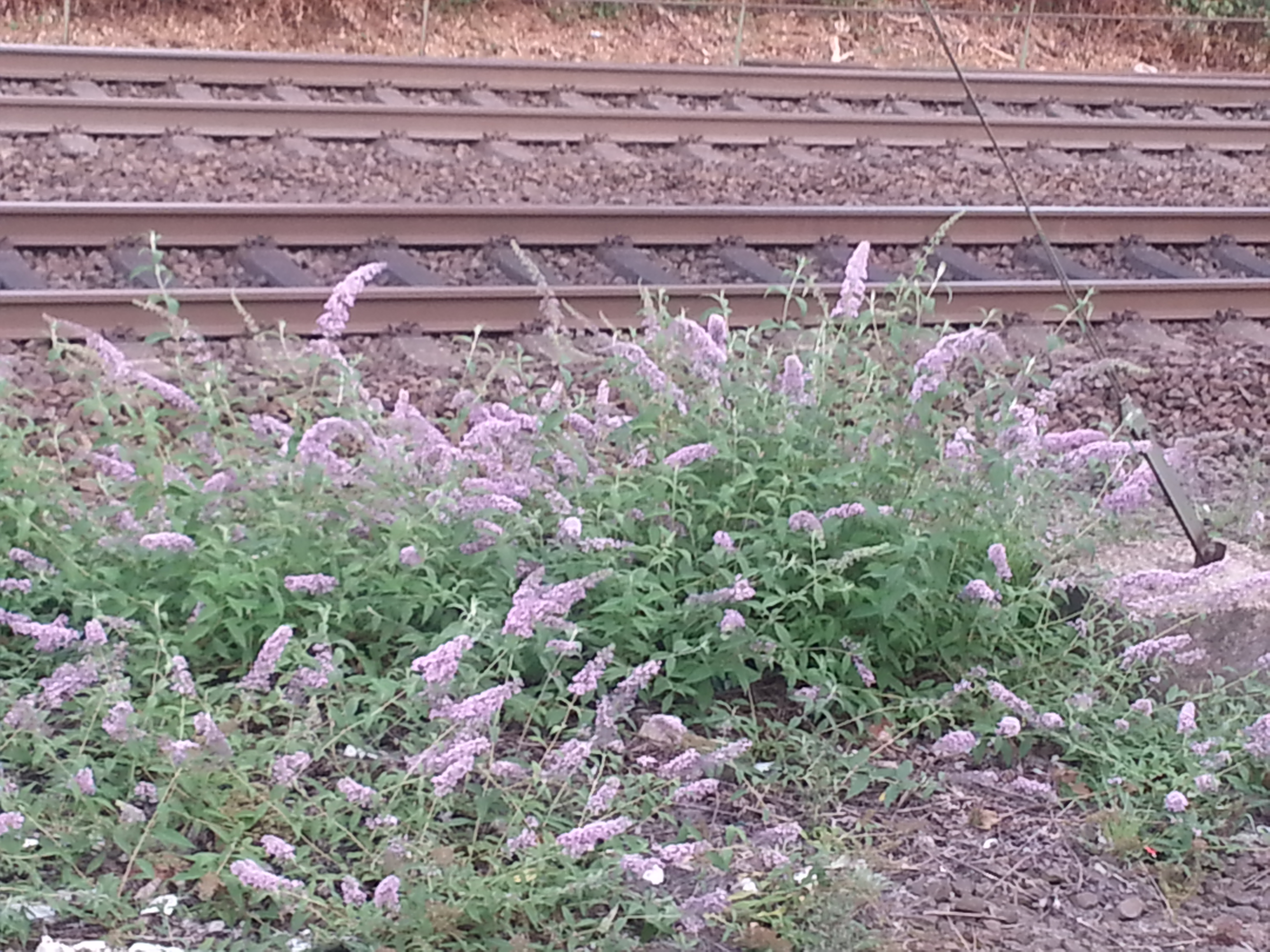
Budleja davidii self-sown along a railroad right-of-way at Düsseldorf, Germany (2016)

Some species commonly escape from the garden. B. davidii in particular is an extensive coloniser of dry open ground. In urban areas in the United Kingdom, it often self-sows on waste ground or old masonry, where it grows into a dense thicket. A number of agricultural organizations and governing authorities throughout the world have designated the plant as an invasive species or a noxious weed. It is frequently seen in the United Kingdom beside railway lines, on the sites of derelict factories and other buildings and, in the aftermath of World War II, on urban bomb sites. That earned it the popular nickname of "the bomb site plant".

Popular garden cultivars include 'Royal Red' (reddish-purple flowers), 'Black Knight' (very dark purple), 'Sungold' (golden yellow), and 'Pink Delight' (pure pink). In recent years, much breeding work has been undertaken to create seed sterile cultivars (see "Non-invasive" Buddleja cultivars). This is a particularly important consideration in the United States, where several states have banned B. davidii and its fertile cultivars because of their invasiveness.

== List of species and naturally occurring hybrids ==
The many species of Buddleja have been the subject of much taxonomic contention. The listing below includes the names, still prevalent in horticulture, of many former Asiatic species sunk by the late Toon Leeuwenberg as Buddleja crispa and adopted as such in the definitive Flora of China.

- Buddleja acuminata Poir.
- Buddleja agathosma Diels
- Buddleja × alata Rehder & E.H.Wilson
- Buddleja albiflora Hemsl.
- Buddleja alternifolia Maxim.
- Buddleja americana L.
- Buddleja anchoensis Kuntze
- Buddleja araucana Phil.
- Buddleja aromatica Rémy
- Buddleja asiatica Lour.
- Buddleja auriculata Benth.
- Buddleja axillaris Willd. ex. Roem. et Schult.
- Buddleja bhutanica T. Yamaz.
- Buddleja blattaria J. F. Macbr.
- Buddleja brachiata Cham. & Schltdl.
- Buddleja brachystachya Diels.
- Buddleja bullata Kunth
- Buddleja candida Dunn
- Buddleja cardanesii Standl. ex E. M. Norman
- Buddleja caryopteridifolia W.W. Sm.
- Buddleja cestriflora Cham.
- Buddleja chapalana B. L. Rob.
- Buddleja chenopodiifolia Kraenzl.
- Buddleja colvilei Hook.f. & Thomson
- Buddleja cordata Kunth
- Buddleja cordobensis Griseb.
- Buddleja coriacea J.Rémy
- Buddleja corrugata M. E. Jones
- Buddleja crispa Benth.
- Buddleja crotonoides A. Gray
- Buddleja cuneata Cham.
- Buddleja curviflora Hook. & Arn.
- Buddleja cuspidata Baker
- Buddleja davidii Franch. (Butterfly bush)
- Buddleja delavayi Gagnep.
- Buddleja diffusa Ruíz & Pav.
- Buddleja domingensis Urb.
- Buddleja dysophylla (Benth.) Radlk.
- Buddleja euryphylla Standl. & Steyerm.
- Buddleja fallowiana Balf.f. & W.W.Sm.
  - var. alba Sabourin
- Buddleja farreri Balf.f & W. W. Sm.
- Buddleja filibracteolata J. A. González & J. F. Morales
- Buddleja forrestii Diels
- Buddleja fragifera Leeuwenb.
- Buddleja fusca Baker
- Buddleja globosa Hope
- Buddleja glomerata H. L. Wendl.
- Buddleja grandiflora Cham. & Schltdl.
- Buddleja hatschbachii E. M. Norman & L. B. Sm.
- Buddleja hieronymi R. E. Fr.
- Buddleja ibarrensis E. M. Norman
- Buddleja incana Ruiz & Pav.
- Buddleja indica Lam.
- Buddleja interrupta Kunth.
- Buddleja iresinoides (Griseb.) Hosseus
- Buddleja jamesonii Benth.
- Buddleja japonica Hemsl.
- Buddleja jinsixiaensis R. B Zhu
- Buddleja kleinii E. M. Norman & L. B. Sm.
- Buddleja lanata Benth.
- Buddleja limitanea W. W. Sm.
- Buddleja lindleyana Fortune ex Lindl.
- Buddleja lojensis E. M. Norman
- Buddleja longifolia Kunth.
- Buddleja longiflora Brade
- Buddleja loricata Leeuwenb.
- Buddleja macrostachya Wallich ex. Benth.
- Buddleja madagascariensis Lam.
- Buddleja marrubiifolia Benth.
- Buddleja megalocephala Donn. Sm.
- Buddleja mendozensis Gillies ex. Benth.
- Buddleja microstachya E. D. Liu
- Buddleja misionum Kraenzl.
- Buddleja montana Britton
- Buddleja myriantha Diels.
- Buddleja nitida Benth.
- Buddleja nivea Duthie
- Buddleja oblonga Benth.
- Buddleja officinalis Maxim.
- Buddleja paniculata Wallich.
- Buddleja parviflora Kunth
- Buddleja perfoliata Kunth
- Buddleja pichinchensis Kunth
- Buddleja polycephala Kunth
- Buddleja polystachya Fresen.
- Buddleja pulchella N. E. Br.
- Buddleja racemosa Torr.
- Buddleja ramboi L. B. Sm.
- Buddleja rufescens Willd. ex Schultes & Schultes
- Buddleja saligna Willd.
- Buddleja salviifolia (L.) Lam.
- Buddleja scordioides Kunth
- Buddleja sessiliflora Kunth
- Buddleja skutchii C. V. Morton
- Buddleja simplex Kraenzl.
- Buddleja soratae Kraenzl.
- Buddleja speciosissima Taub.
- Buddleja sphaerocalyx Baker
- Buddleja stachyoides Cham & Schltdl.
- Buddleja stenostachya Rehder & E.H.Wilson
- Buddleja sterniana A. D. Cotton
- Buddleja suaveolens Kunth & Bouché
- Buddleja subcapitata E. D. Liu
- Buddleja tibetica W. W. Sm.
- Buddleja thyrsoides Lam.
- Buddleja tubiflora Benth.
- Buddleja tucumanensis Griseb.
- Buddleja utahensis Coville
- Buddleja vexans Kraenzl. & Loes. ex E. M. Norman
- Buddleja × wardii C.Marquand
- Buddleja yunnanensis Gagnep.

=== Formerly placed here ===
- Cephalanthus glabratus (Spreng.) K.Schum. (as B. glabrata Spreng.)

== Gallery ==
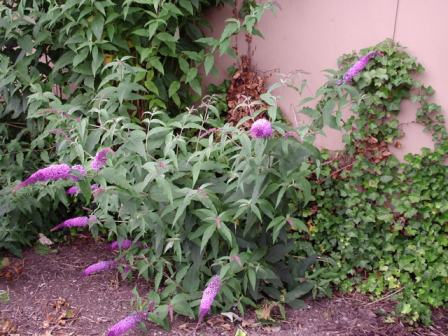
B. davidii – Invasive species, here in an urban area

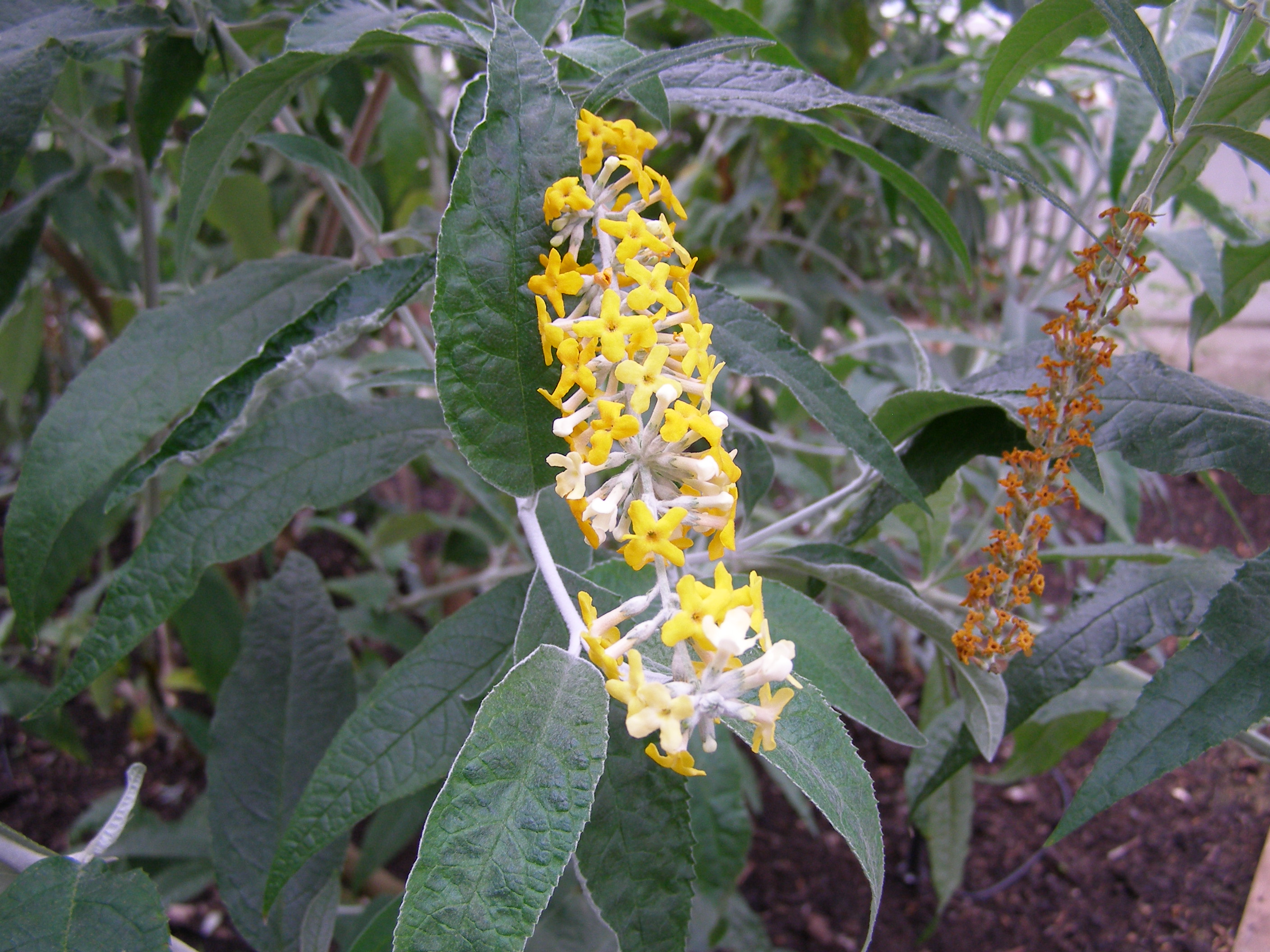
Buddleja madagascariensis – flowers and foliage

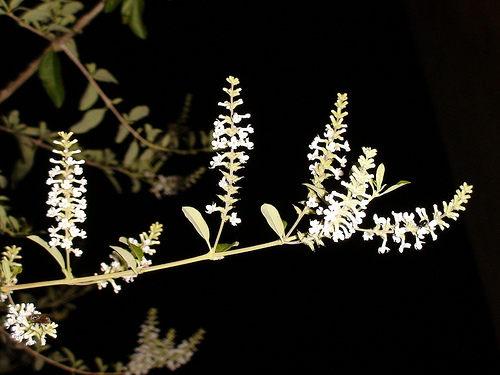
Unidentified Buddleja species in Igarata, Brazil

Monarch butterfly feeding on Buddleja in Connecticut

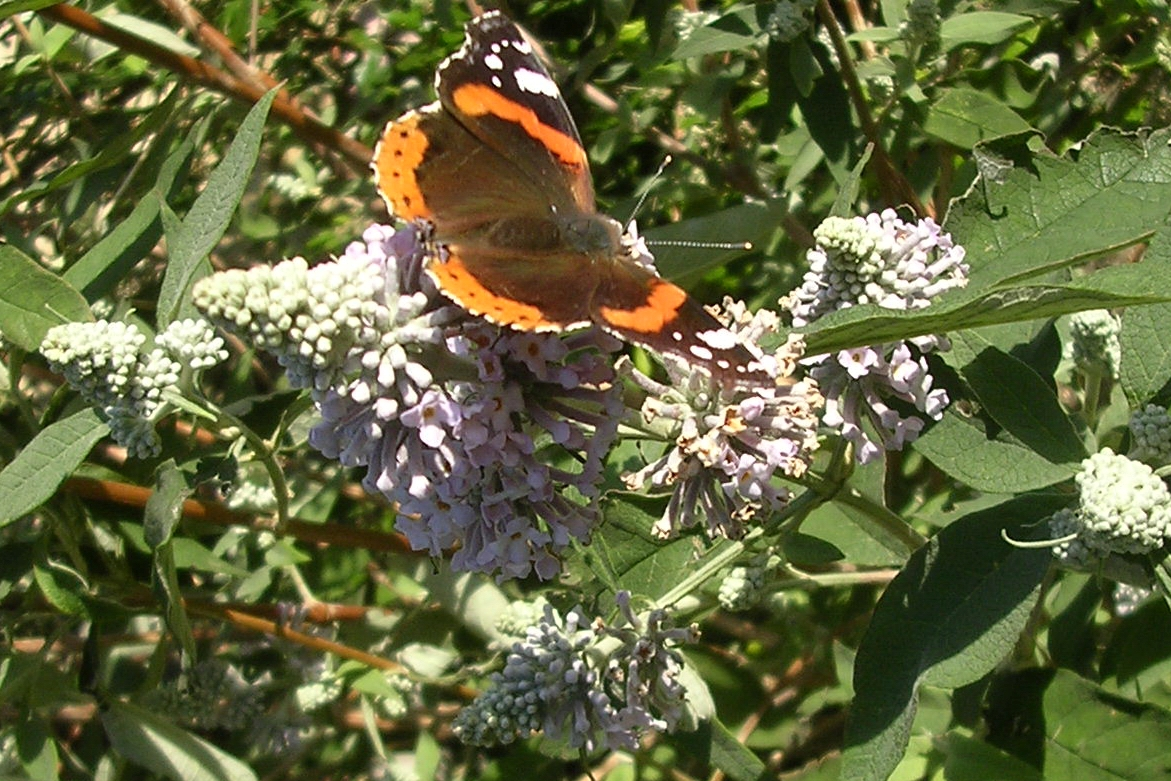
Red Admiral butterfly feeding on Buddleja officinalis in January

== RHS Award of Garden Merit ==
The following Buddleja species and cultivars are (2017) holders of the Royal Horticultural Society's Award of Garden Merit:

- B. alternifolia
- B. asiatica
- B. davidii 'Black Knight'
- B. davidii 'Blue Horizon'
- B. davidii 'Camkeep' = Camberwell Beauty
- B. davidii 'Darent Valley'
- B. davidii 'Dartmoor'
- B. davidii 'Monum' = Nanho Purple
- B. davidii 'Monite' = Nanho White
- B. davidii 'Royal Red'
- B. davidii 'White Profusion'
- B. fallowiana var. alba
- B. globosa
- B. 'Lochinch'
- B. madagascariensis
- B. 'Miss Ruby'
- B. officinalis
- B. 'Pink Delight'
- B. 'West Hill'
- B. × weyeriana 'Sungold'

== Monographs ==
=== Asiatic and African species ===
- Leeuwenberg, A. J. M. (1979) The Loganiaceae of Africa XVIII Buddleja L. II, Revision of the African & Asiatic species. H. Veenman & Zonen, Wageningen, Nederland.

=== North and South American species ===
- Norman, E. (2000). Buddlejaceae. Flora Neotropica, Vol. 81. New York Botanical Garden, USA. ISSN 0071-5794

=== Cultivated species and cultivars ===
- Stuart, D. (2006). Buddlejas. RHS Plant Collector Guide. Timber Press, Oregon, USA. ISBN 978-0-88192-688-0
