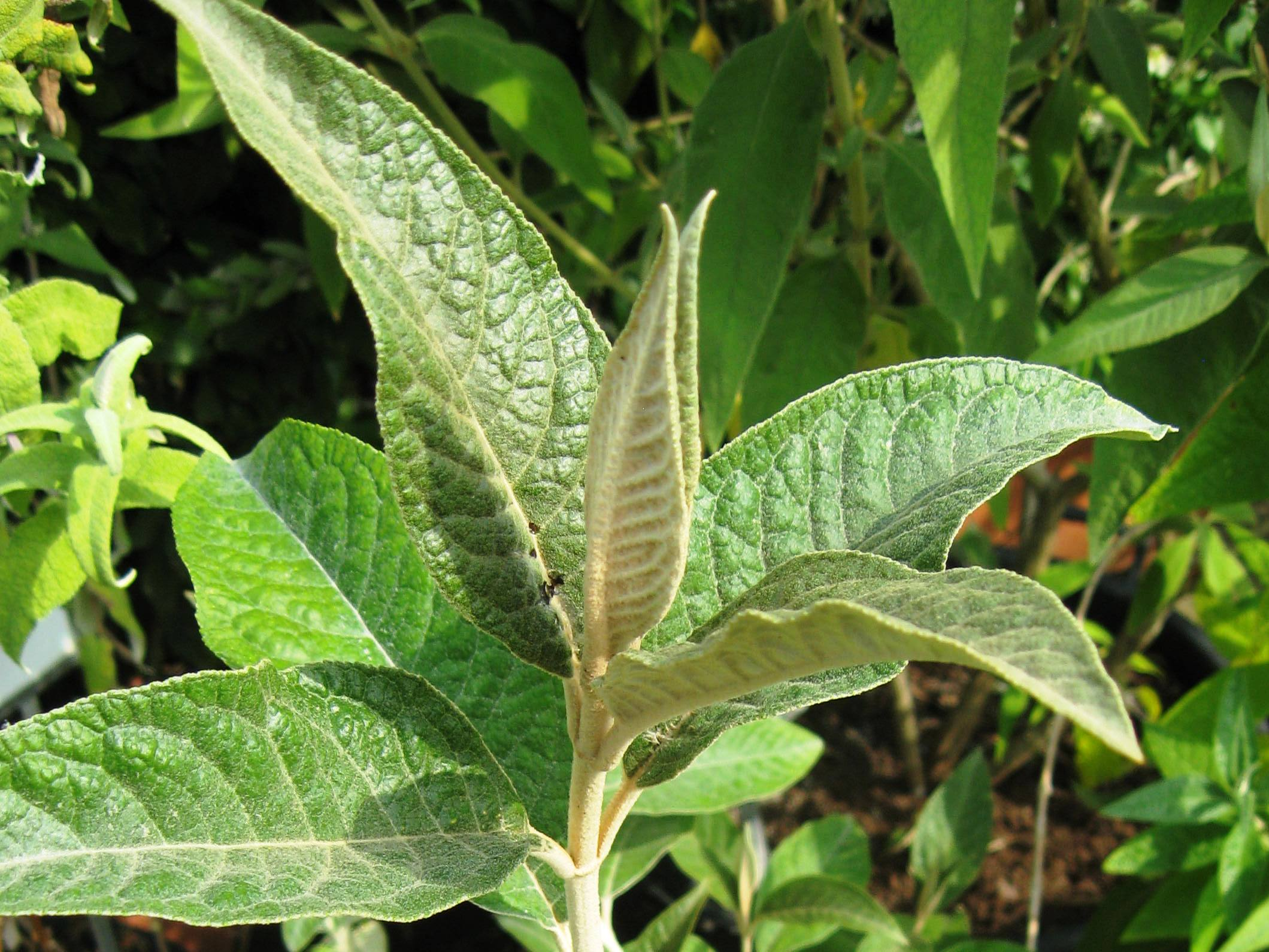

Scientific classification
- Kingdom: Plantae
- Clade: Tracheophytes
- Clade: Angiosperms
- Clade: Eudicots
- Clade: Asterids
- Order: Lamiales
- Family: Scrophulariaceae
- Genus: Buddleja
- Species: B. megalocephala

Binomial name
- Buddleja megalocephala Donn. Sm.

Synonyms
- Buddleja hysophila I. M. Johnst.; Buddleja megalocephala Donn. Sm. f. albilanata

= Buddleja megalocephala =

Species of flowering plant

Buddleja megalocephala is a species endemic to Guatemala, in the Central Highlands, the Sierra de los Cuchumatanes, and Mt. Tacana on the border with Mexico, where it grows in open areas associated with evergreen cloud forest at elevations of 2700 – 4,000 m. The species was first named and described by Smith in 1897.

== Description ==
Buddleja megalocephala is a dioecious tree 5 – 15 m high with a trunk < 65 cm in diameter at the base, with brown fissured bark. The young branches are thick, quadrangular and densely tomentose, bearing lanceolate or elliptic-oblong leaves 7 – 20 cm long by 2 – 6 cm wide on 1 – 2 cm petioles, subcoriaceous, glabrescent above, tomentose below. The inflorescence measures 6 – 20 cm by 8 – 10 cm, comprising globose heads in racemes, occasionally with two orders of branches; the heads 1.2 – 2 cm in diameter, each with 40 – 50 orange flowers; the corollas 4 – 5 mm long. Ploidy: 2n = 76.

== Cultivation ==
The tree is in commerce in the UK; suppliers can be found in the RHS Plantfinder.
