= Buddleja hatschbachii =

Scientific classification
- Kingdom: Plantae
- Clade: Tracheophytes
- Clade: Angiosperms
- Clade: Eudicots
- Clade: Asterids
- Order: Lamiales
- Family: Scrophulariaceae
- Genus: Buddleja
- Species: B. hatschbachii

Binomial name
- Buddleja hatschbachii E. M. Norman & L. B. Sm.

Species of flowering plant

Buddleja hatschbachii is a rare species found only in the wet ravines and rock slopes flanking the east side of the planalto of southern Brazil. The species was first described and named by Norman and Smith in 1976.

== Description ==
Buddleja hatschbachii is a hermaphroditic subshrub 1 m high with brownish bark. The young branches are quadrangular, and covered with a whitish tomentum, bearing sessile lanceolate leaves 10 – 16 cm long by 2.5 – 4.5 cm wide, membranaceous, glabrescent above, and lanose below. The cream or white inflorescence is 10 – 20 cm long. The sessile perfect flowers occur in pairs of cymes, each with 3 – 12 flowers, borne in the axils of the reduced leaves or bracts. The tubular corolla is 15 – 20 mm long.

== Cultivation ==
The shrub is not known to be in cultivation.
