= Buddleja polystachya =

Scientific classification
- Kingdom: Plantae
- Clade: Tracheophytes
- Clade: Angiosperms
- Clade: Eudicots
- Clade: Asterids
- Order: Lamiales
- Family: Scrophulariaceae
- Genus: Buddleja
- Species: B. polystachya

Binomial name
- Buddleja polystachya Fresen.

Synonyms
- Buddleja polystachya var. parvifolia Marquand; Buddleja powellii Kränzl.; Buddleja rufa Fresen.; Buddleja saltiana. Steud.

Species of flowering plant

Buddleja polystachya is a multi-branched shrub or occasionally small tree endemic to the semi-arid highlands flanking the Red Sea in Eritrea, Ethiopia, Saudi Arabia, Somalia and Yemen, where it grows in secondary scrub or around forest, often along watercourses, at elevations of between 2,200 and 3,600 m; its range extends southward into the highlands of Kenya and Tanzania. The species was named by Georg Fresenius in the early part of the 19th century.

== Description ==
Buddleja polystachya usually grows to < 5 m, but can occasionally reach 12 m in favourable conditions. The bark can be either red-brown or grey in colour. The flowers are generally bright orange, forming dense panicles < 20 cm long; however, specimens found in Saudi Arabia bear flowers with yellow corollas, and only the lobes are orange. The scent is reported to range from sweet to acrid. The leaves are < 15 cm long and narrow, with a pointed tip, the upper surface a pale grey-green. The fruit is a small dry orange capsule.

== Cultivation ==
Buddleja polystachya is not known in Europe or North America. The shrub can be easily propagated from seed and cuttings. Hardiness: USDA zones 7–9.

== Uses ==
The fruits are eaten raw, the leaves used as animal fodder.
