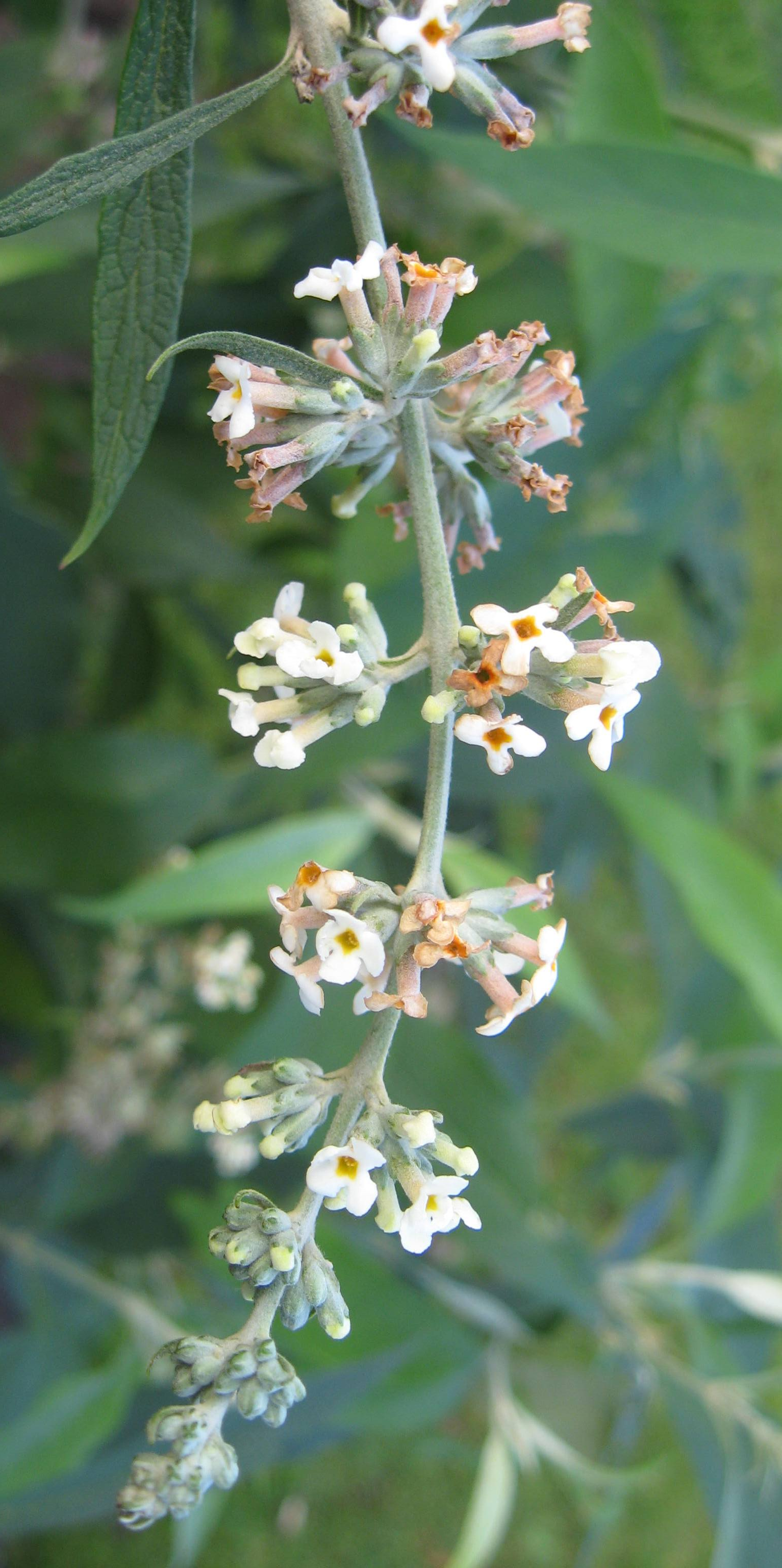
- Buddleja paniculata inflorescence

Scientific classification
- Kingdom: Plantae
- Clade: Embryophytes
- Clade: Tracheophytes
- Clade: Spermatophytes
- Clade: Angiosperms
- Clade: Eudicots
- Clade: Asterids
- Order: Lamiales
- Family: Scrophulariaceae
- Genus: Buddleja
- Species: B. paniculata

Binomial name
- Buddleja paniculata Wall.

Synonyms
- Buddleja acutifolia C.H.Wright; Buddleja lavandulacea Kraenzl.; Buddleja gynandra C.Marquand; Buddleja mairei H.Lév.; Buddleja mairei var. albiflora H.Lév.

= Buddleja paniculata =

Species of flowering plant

Buddleja paniculata is a species of flowering plant in the figwort family Scrophulariaceae, endemic to a wide upland area from northern India to Bhutan, growing along forest margins, in thickets, and on rocky slopes at elevations of 500–3,000 m (1,600–9,800 ft). The species was named by Wallich and introduced to the UK in 1823 as seed sent by Major Madden from the Himalayas to the Glasnevin Botanic Garden.

== Description ==
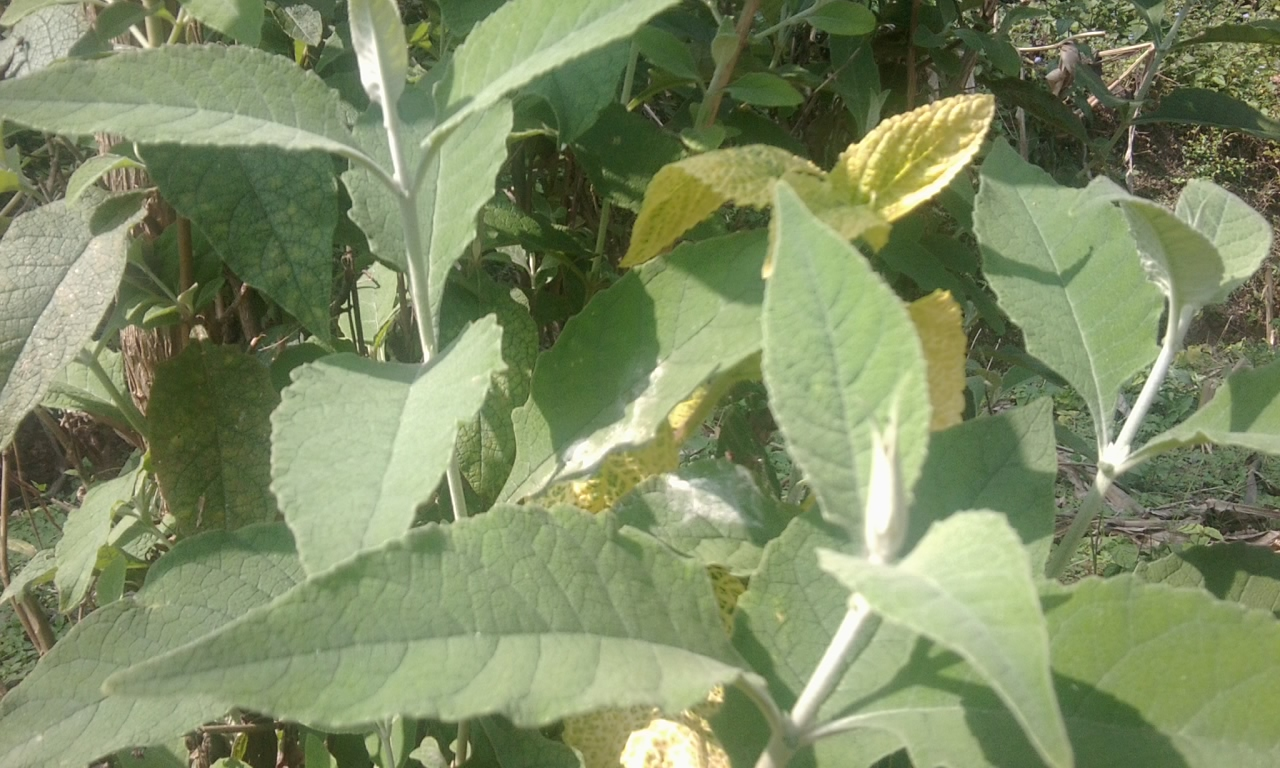
B. paniculata in Nepal

Buddleja paniculata is a variable deciduous shrub or tree of bushy habit, occasionally reaching 6 m (20 ft) high. The sparse terminal panicles comprise white or pale lilac flowers, some forms pleasantly scented, others not, from December to mid-spring. The bright green lanceolate leaves are opposite, up to 25 cm (9.8 in) in length, and covered in fine hairs. 2n = 38.

== Cultivation ==
Owing to its limited horticultural merit, B. paniculata is rarely cultivated. Moreover, it demands dry soils and frost protection over winter. In the UK, it is grown under glass as part of the NCCPG national collection at Longstock Park Nursery, near Stockbridge. Hardiness: USDA zone 8.

== Literature ==
- Leeuwenberg, A. J. M. (1979) The Loganiaceae of Africa XVIII Buddleja L. II, Revision of the African & Asiatic species. H. Veenman & Zonen, Wageningen, Nederland.
- Li, P. T. & Leeuwenberg, A. J. M. (1996). Loganiaceae, in Wu, Z. & Raven, P. (eds) Flora of China, Vol. 15. Science Press, Beijing, and Missouri Botanical Garden Press, St. Louis, USA. ISBN 978-0915279371 online at www.efloras.org
