= Buddleja jinsixiaensis =

Scientific classification
- Kingdom: Plantae
- Clade: Embryophytes
- Clade: Tracheophytes
- Clade: Spermatophytes
- Clade: Angiosperms
- Clade: Eudicots
- Clade: Asterids
- Order: Lamiales
- Family: Scrophulariaceae
- Genus: Buddleja
- Species: B. jinsixiaensis

Binomial name
- Buddleja jinsixiaensis R.B.Zhu

Species of plant

Buddleja jinsixiaensis is a newly discovered species endemic to Shaanxi, China, where it grows in the Jinxia Grand Canyon at an elevation of c. 1,200 m. Two specimens were found, one in Quercus forest, another on a rocky slope, by a team led by Renbin Zhu in May 2013.

== Description ==
Buddleja jinsixiaensis grows to 1–1.5 m in height. The bark of older branches exfoliates in strips. The younger twigs are subterete, stellate tomentose, soon becoming glabrescent. The opposite ovate to narrowly lanceolate leaves are 6–12 long by 2–4 cm wide, both surfaces green and glabrescent, the margins serrate. The inflorescences comprise terminal paniculate cymes, rather lax, each bearing 3–11 blue-purple flowers with white eyes, the corollas 9–11 mm long. Morphologically similar to B. delavayi, B. jinsixiaensis flowers in May, and fruits in August.

== Cultivation ==
The species is not known to be in cultivation beyond China.
