= Buddleja simplex =

Scientific classification
- Kingdom: Plantae
- Clade: Embryophytes
- Clade: Tracheophytes
- Clade: Spermatophytes
- Clade: Angiosperms
- Clade: Eudicots
- Clade: Asterids
- Order: Lamiales
- Family: Scrophulariaceae
- Genus: Buddleja
- Species: B. simplex

Binomial name
- Buddleja simplex Kraenzl.

Synonyms
- Buddleja saltillensis Kraenzl.

Extinct species of flowering plant

Buddleja simplex is probably extinct, as no record of it has been made for nearly 200 years. It was a species endemic to Saltillo in Mexico, described and named by Kraenzlin in 1912.

== Description ==
Buddleja simplex is a small shrub, the young branches subquadrangular with adpressed tomentum. The small, membranaceous oblong to elliptic or oblong to lanceolate leaves have 0.5 – 1.5 cm petioles, and are 2 – 4 cm long by 0.5 – 1.2 cm wide, tomentulose above, tomentose below. The bracted inflorescences are 5 – 10 cm long, comprising 8 – 10 pairs of sessile or pedunculate heads < 0.6 cm in diameter.

The species is considered very close to B. sessiliflora, the latter having marginally larger flower heads and longer fruits.
