= Buddleja cuneata =

Scientific classification
- Kingdom: Plantae
- Clade: Embryophytes
- Clade: Tracheophytes
- Clade: Spermatophytes
- Clade: Angiosperms
- Clade: Eudicots
- Clade: Asterids
- Order: Lamiales
- Family: Scrophulariaceae
- Genus: Buddleja
- Species: B. cuneata

Binomial name
- Buddleja cuneata Cham.

Species of flowering plant

Buddleja cuneata is a rare species endemic only to the southern plateau of Brazil, where it grows in dry and rocky fields from Paraná to Rio Grande do Sul. The species was first described and named by Chamisso in 1833.

== Description ==
Buddleja cuneata is a dioecious shrub < 2 m high, with brown bark longitudinally fissured. The young branches are subquadrangular and tomentose. The leaves are obovate to elliptic, 3–5 cm long by 1.5–2.5 cm wide, with a glabrescent upper surface, tomentose below. The white to cream inflorescences are 4–10 cm long by 1.5–3 cm wide on one or two orders of branches, comprising sessile or short-pedunculate paired heads 1 cm in diameter, each with 6–9 flowers; the corolla tubes are 4–4.5 mm long.

== Cultivation ==
The shrub is not known to be in cultivation.
