= Buddleja brachystachya =

Scientific classification
- Kingdom: Plantae
- Clade: Embryophytes
- Clade: Tracheophytes
- Clade: Spermatophytes
- Clade: Angiosperms
- Clade: Eudicots
- Clade: Asterids
- Order: Lamiales
- Family: Scrophulariaceae
- Genus: Buddleja
- Species: B. brachystachya

Binomial name
- Buddleja brachystachya Diels.

Synonyms
- Buddleja nana W. W. Sm.; Buddleja purdomii W. W. Sm.

Species of plant

Buddleja brachystachya is a small shrub endemic to the Yunnan, Sichuan and Gansu provinces of China, where it grows on open, rocky, often dry, places at altitudes of 2,000–2,400 m. It was first described and named by Diels in 1912.

== Description ==
Buddleja brachystachya grows to 0.3–0.9 m in height, with subquadrangular to subterete, densely stellate-tomentose branchlets. The small, opposite leaves have elliptic blades, 1–3.5 cm long by 0.5–1.7 cm wide, acute or obtuse at the apex, cuneate or decurrent at the base, the margins entire. The lavender inflorescences are small, thyrsoid, and often few-flowered, 1.5–3 cm long by 1.5–2.5 cm wide, the corollas 11–18 mm long. Ploidy 2n = 38 (diploid).

== Cultivation ==
The species is uncommon in cultivation. Hardiness: USDA zone 10.
