= Buddleja longifolia =

Scientific classification
- Kingdom: Plantae
- Clade: Tracheophytes
- Clade: Angiosperms
- Clade: Eudicots
- Clade: Asterids
- Order: Lamiales
- Family: Scrophulariaceae
- Genus: Buddleja
- Species: B. longifolia

Binomial name
- Buddleja longifolia Kunth

Species of tree

Buddleja longifolia is a species now restricted to remnants of montane forest in Loja, Ecuador, and northern Peru at altitudes of 2100 – 2600 m. The species was first described and named by Kunth in 1818.

== Description ==
Buddleja longifolia is a dioecious shrub or small tree 1–7 m, occasionally <10 m, high with grey, furrowed bark. The young branches are quadrangular and tomentulose, bearing oblong-lanceolate to oblong elliptic leaves 10 – 20 cm long by 3 – 6.5 cm wide, glabrescent above, tomentose to tomentulose below. The white to pale yellow paniculate inflorescence is 15 – 25 cm long by 15 – 22 cm wide with three orders of branches, the flowers borne in sessile cymules 4 –7 mm in diameter, each with 1 – 6 flowers. The corolla is 2 – 3 mm long.

== Cultivation ==
The species is not known to be in cultivation.
