= Buddleja lanata =

Conservation status
- Vulnerable (IUCN 3.1)

Scientific classification
- Kingdom: Plantae
- Clade: Tracheophytes
- Clade: Angiosperms
- Clade: Eudicots
- Clade: Asterids
- Order: Lamiales
- Family: Scrophulariaceae
- Genus: Buddleja
- Species: B. lanata

Binomial name
- Buddleja lanata Benth.

Species of flowering plant

Buddleja lanata is a species endemic to Ecuador where it grows on dry, windy plateaux amid grasses and bracken at elevations of 1,150 – 2,700 m. The species, first named and described by Bentham in 1845 is now threatened by habitat loss.

== Description ==
Buddleja lanata is a dioecious shrub or subshrub, 0.5 – 1 m high with greyish bark at the base. The stems are terete and lanate, bearing leaves on petioles 0.5 – 2 cm long. The leaves are ovate, 7 – 10 cm long by 4 – 7.5 cm wide, lanate on both sides. The yellow inflorescences have a strong fragrance, and are typically 10 – 25 cm long, comprising 5 – 10 pairs of pedunculate heads in the axils of the reduced terminal leaves. The heads are 1.2 – 1.5 cm in diameter, each with 20 – 25 flowers; the corollas 3.5 – 4.5 mm long, males more open at the throat.

== Cultivation ==
The shrub is not known to be in cultivation.
