= Buddleja rufescens =

Scientific classification
- Kingdom: Plantae
- Clade: Embryophytes
- Clade: Tracheophytes
- Clade: Spermatophytes
- Clade: Angiosperms
- Clade: Eudicots
- Clade: Asterids
- Order: Lamiales
- Family: Scrophulariaceae
- Genus: Buddleja
- Species: B. rufescens

Binomial name
- Buddleja rufescens Willd. ex Schultes & Schultes

Synonyms
- Buddleja occidentalis Ruiz & Pav.; Buddleja occidentalis Kunth

Species of plant

Buddleja rufescens is endemic to western Peru from Piura to Ica where it grows along roadsides, dry river courses, and in remnants of scrubby woodland from sea level to 2,000 m. The species was first named and described by Willdenow in 1827.

== Description ==
Buddleja rufescens is a trioecious shrub 1 – 3 m tall with blackish fissured bark. The young branches are subquadrangular and tomentulose bearing membranaceous oblong-lanceolate or lanceolate leaves 9 – 15 cm long by 3.5 – 7 cm wide, with 0.5 – 2 cm petioles. The pale yellow paniculate leafy-bracted inflorescences are 10 – 25 cm long by 10 – 15 cm comprising 2 orders of branches bearing small cymules with 3 – 5 flowers, the corollas 2 – 3 mm long. Ploidy: 2n = 152.

== Cultivation ==
The species is grown at the Museum of Natural History, Lima, and the University of California Botanical Garden, Berkeley.
