= Buddleja lojensis =

Conservation status
- Vulnerable (IUCN 3.1)

Scientific classification
- Kingdom: Plantae
- Clade: Embryophytes
- Clade: Tracheophytes
- Clade: Spermatophytes
- Clade: Angiosperms
- Clade: Eudicots
- Clade: Asterids
- Order: Lamiales
- Family: Scrophulariaceae
- Genus: Buddleja
- Species: B. lojensis

Binomial name
- Buddleja lojensis E. M. Norman

Species of plant

Buddleja lojensis is a species endemic to the Loja region of southern Ecuador, and Piura in Peru, where it grows on mountains, savannahs and scrub, notably near streams, at elevations of 1,600 – 2,550 m. The species was first identified and described by Norman in 1982.

== Description ==
Buddleja lojensis is a dioecious shrub 1 – 3 m tall with yellowish bark. The young branches are subquadrangular, almost glabrous, bearing subsessile ovate or lanceolate leaves 7 – 10 cm long by 2.4 – 4 cm wide, membranaceous, glabrescent above and below. The pale yellow paniculate inflorescences are 7 – 15 cm long by 4 – 9 cm wide, comprising 2 – 3 orders of leafy-bracted branches bearing small cymules of 5 – 10 flowers, the corollas 2.5 – 4 mm long.

== Cultivation ==
The species is not known to be in cultivation.
