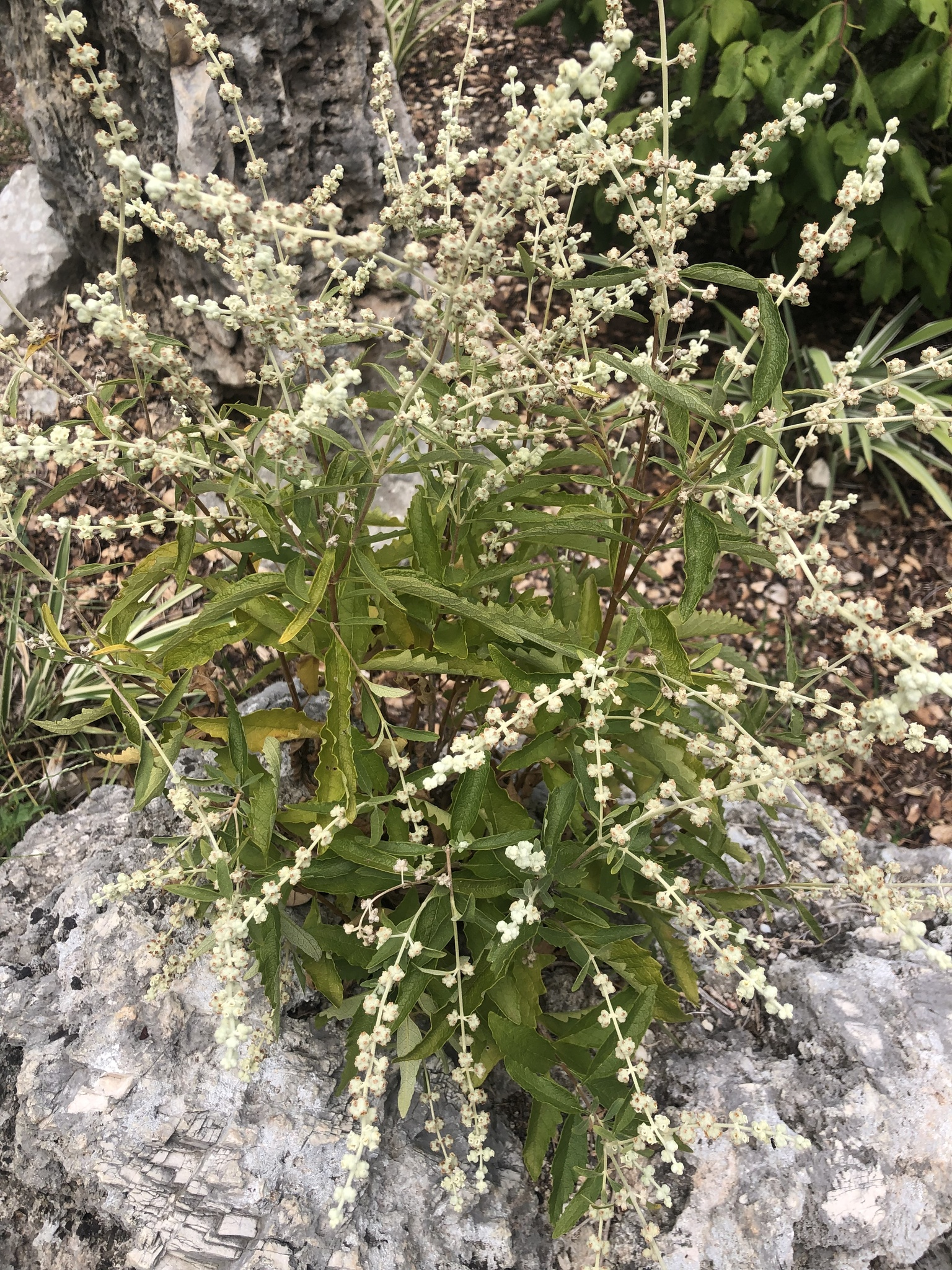

Conservation status
- Apparently Secure (NatureServe)

Scientific classification
- Kingdom: Plantae
- Clade: Tracheophytes
- Clade: Angiosperms
- Clade: Eudicots
- Clade: Asterids
- Order: Lamiales
- Family: Scrophulariaceae
- Genus: Buddleja
- Species: B. racemosa

Binomial name
- Buddleja racemosa Torr.

= Buddleja racemosa =

Species of flowering plant

Buddleja racemosa, commonly known as the Wand (or Texas) Butterfly Bush, is endemic to the southern edge of the limestone Edwards Plateau in Texas, United States, from Austin to Rocksprings, growing around streams, creeks and springs at elevations of 250–750 m (820–2,460 ft). The plant was first named and described by John Torrey in 1859.

== Description ==
Buddleja racemosa is a small, lax, dioecious shrub 0.3–1.5 m (1 ft 0 in – 4 ft 11 in) tall, with greyish-brown rimose bark and persistent old branches. The young branches are terete, tomentose and glandular, bearing small subcoriaceous ovate-oblong to lanceolate leaves 3–10 cm (1.2–3.9 in) long by 1.5–4 cm (0.59–1.57 in) wide, with petioles <2 cm (0.79 in) long. The pale yellow inflorescences are 8–30 cm (3.1–11.8 in) long, usually comprising 8 – 12 pairs of small globose heads 0.5–0.7 cm (0.20–0.28 in) in diameter, each head with 6 – 12 flowers. Ploidy: 2n = 38.

== Varieties ==
Norman identifies two varieties distinguished by the number of stellate hairs on the undersides of the leaves:

- Buddleja racemosa var. incana
- Buddleja racemosa var. racemosa

== Cultivation ==
The species is not known to be in cultivation.
