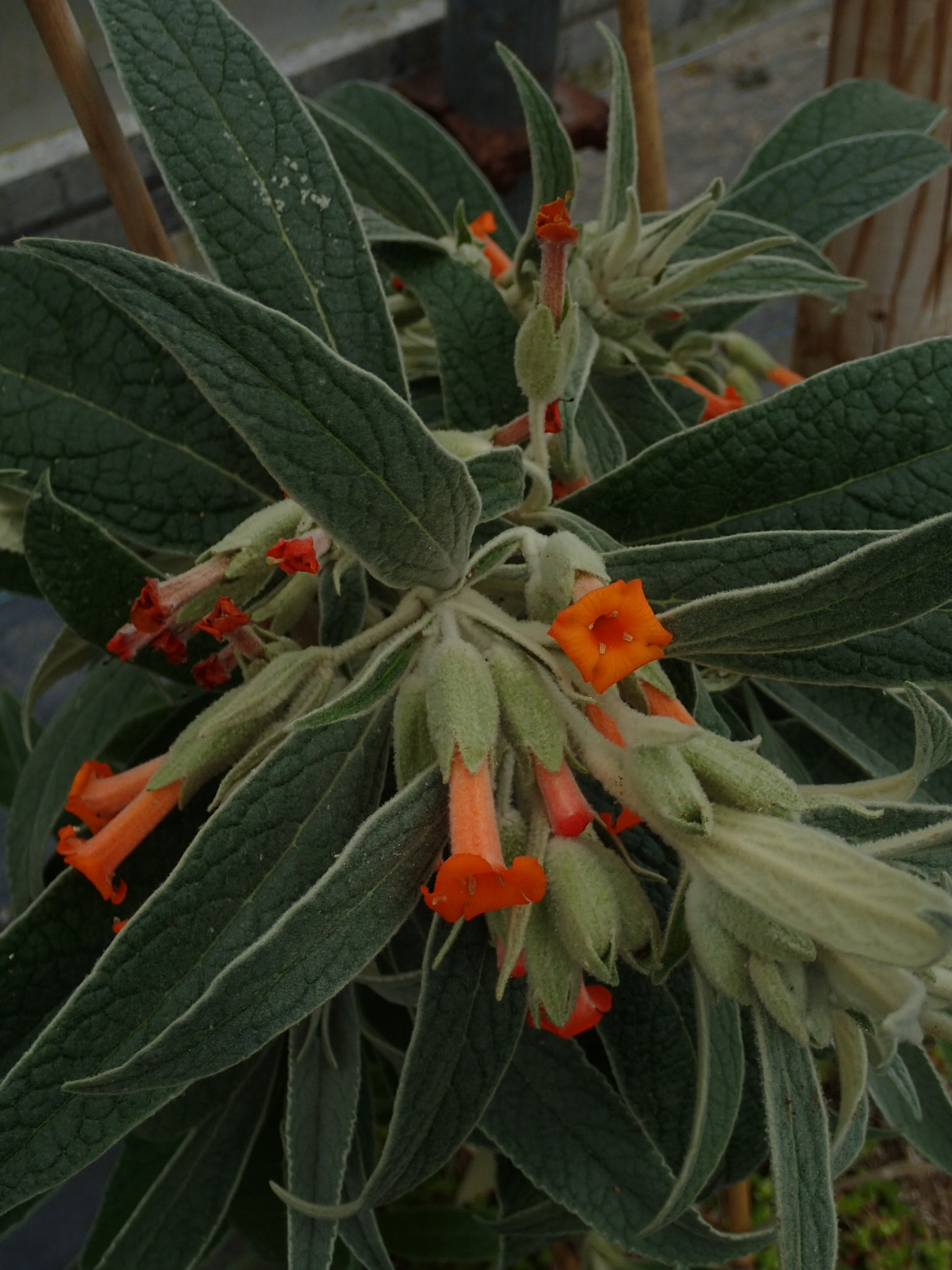

Scientific classification
- Kingdom: Plantae
- Clade: Tracheophytes
- Clade: Angiosperms
- Clade: Eudicots
- Clade: Asterids
- Order: Lamiales
- Family: Scrophulariaceae
- Genus: Buddleja
- Species: B. speciosissima

Binomial name
- Buddleja speciosissima Taub.

Synonyms
- Buddleja ulei Dusen

= Buddleja speciosissima =

Species of flowering plant

Buddleja speciosissima is a rare species restricted to Mount Itatiaia in Brazil, where it grows in rocky grassland at elevations of 2,000–2,500 m. It was first described and named by Taubert in 1893.

== Description ==
Buddleja speciosissima is a shrub 1–3 m high with light-brown fissured bark. It bears hermaphroditic flowers, unlike most South American members of the genus which are cryptically dioecious. The young branches are thick, subquadrangular, and covered with a dense pale yellow indumentum, bearing subcoriaceous elliptic to lanceolate leaves with 1–3.5 cm petioles, and measuring 10–18 cm long by 2–4 cm wide, glabrescent above but tomentose below. The reddish-orange leafy inflorescences are 10–20 cm long, comprising 1–2 orders of branches bearing paired three flowered cymes, the corollas 25–30 mm long by 4 mm wide, pollination being by hummingbirds. Ploidy: 2n = 38.

== Cultivation ==
The shrub is rare in cultivation.
