= Buddleja soratae =

Scientific classification
- Kingdom: Plantae
- Clade: Embryophytes
- Clade: Tracheophytes
- Clade: Spermatophytes
- Clade: Angiosperms
- Clade: Eudicots
- Clade: Asterids
- Order: Lamiales
- Family: Scrophulariaceae
- Genus: Buddleja
- Species: B. soratae

Binomial name
- Buddleja soratae Kraenzl.

Species of flowering plant

Buddleja soratae is a rare species endemic to one small area of Bolivia around Sorata, growing along forest edges at altitudes of 2,700 – 3,200 m; it was first described and named by Kraenzlin in 1913.

== Description ==
Buddleja soratae is a dioecious shrub or small tree 5–6 m high. The younger branches are quadrangular, the youngest sections tomentose, bearing membranaceous lanceolate to elliptic leaves with 0.5–1 cm petioles, and are 7–14 cm long by 2–4 cm wide, glabrescent above but tomentose below. The orange leafy-bracted inflorescences are 12–15 cm long by 10–15 cm wide, comprising 2–3 orders of branches bearing cymes of 6–9 flowers on peduncles 0.5–1 cm long.

Buddleja soratae is considered very similar to B. cardanasii and B. multiceps, differing from the latter only in the shape of the leaves.

== Cultivation ==
The shrub is not known to be in cultivation.
