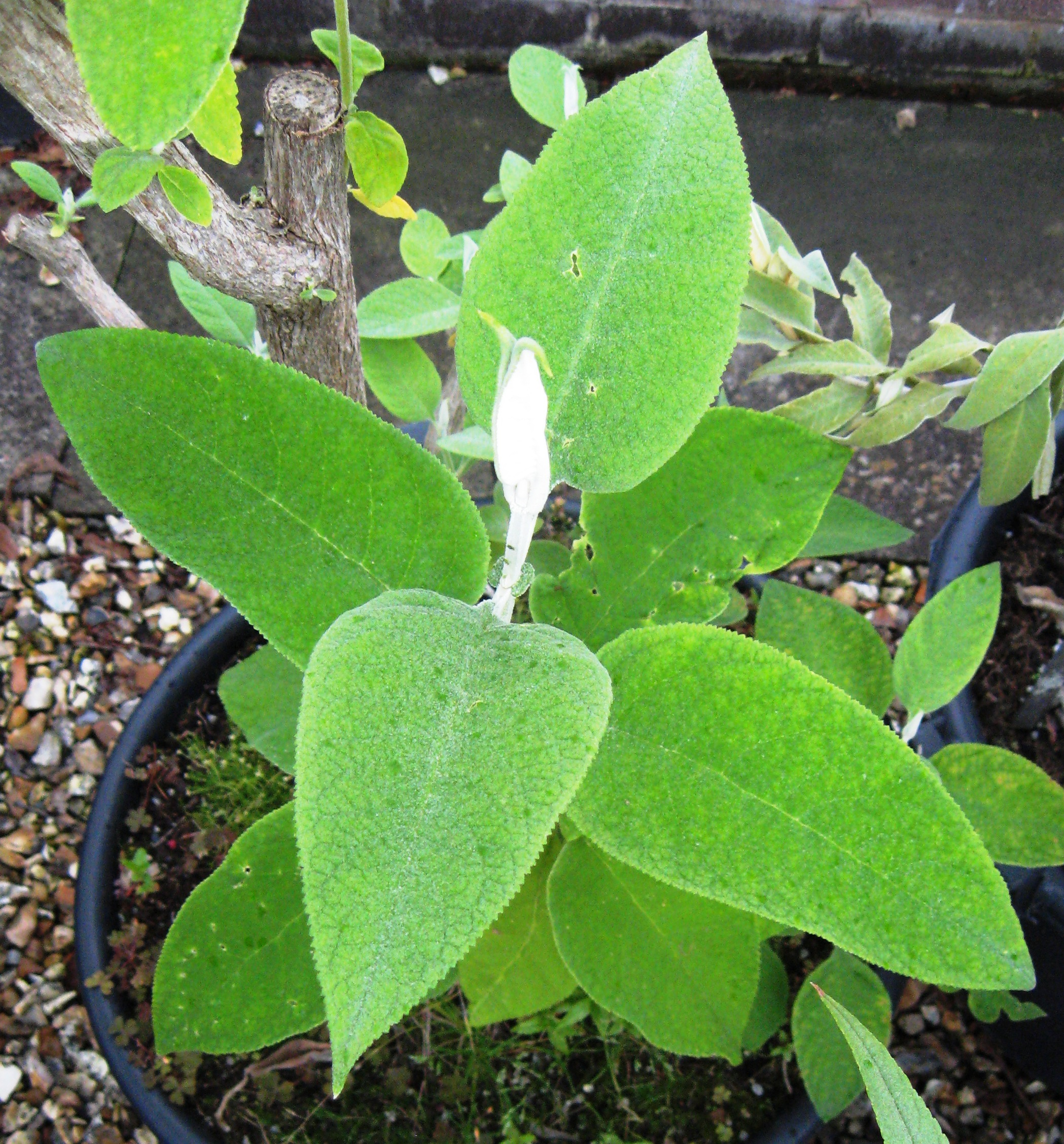
- Buddleja crotonoides foliage, Longstock Park Nursery

Scientific classification
- Kingdom: Plantae
- Clade: Tracheophytes
- Clade: Angiosperms
- Clade: Eudicots
- Clade: Asterids
- Order: Lamiales
- Family: Scrophulariaceae
- Genus: Buddleja
- Species: B. crotonoides

Binomial name
- Buddleja crotonoides A.Gray

Synonyms
- Buddleja amplexicaulis Standl. & Steyerm.; Buddleja crotonoides A. Gray subsp. amplexicaulis Standl. & Steyerm.; Buddleja purpusii Standl.; Buddleja stenoptera Standl. & Steyerm.; Buddleja textlica Loes.

= Buddleja crotonoides =

Species of flowering plant

Buddleja crotonoides is a shrub with a wide distribution, from California south to Nicaragua. The shrub grows at elevations of 2,000–2,500 m in oak woods and on scree in association with Arbutus xalapiensis, Pinus sp., and Crataegus mexicana. B. crotonoides was first named and described by Gray in 1847.

== Description ==
Buddleja crotonoides makes a large shrub or small tree, < 5 m high, chiefly distinguished by its large leaves, < 20 cm in length, covered top and undersides with dense, soft hairs. The inflorescences are < 20 cm long, the flowers greenish-white or greenish-yellow. Ploidy: 2n = 76 (tetraploid).

== Cultivation ==
Buddleja crotonoides is uncommon in the UK. Specimens are held as part of the NCCPG national collection at the Longstock Park Nursery, near Stockbridge. Although not hardy in the UK, the shrub can occasionally survive when given proper frost protection, preferably by being kept potted, and moved indoors at the onset of winter. Hardiness: USDA zone 9.
