= Buddleja mendozensis =

Scientific classification
- Kingdom: Plantae
- Clade: Tracheophytes
- Clade: Angiosperms
- Clade: Eudicots
- Clade: Asterids
- Order: Lamiales
- Family: Scrophulariaceae
- Genus: Buddleja
- Species: B. mendozensis

Binomial name
- Buddleja mendozensis Gillies ex Benth.

Synonyms
- Buddleja kurtzii Kraenzl.; Buddleja lucae Niederl.; Buddleja mendozensis Gillies ex Benth. var. tenuifolia (Griseb.) Hieron; Buddleja tenuifolia Griseb.

Species of flowering plant

Buddleja mendozensis is an extremely variable species endemic to the xeric and subxeric areas of Argentina, from Jujuy to southern Mendoza and La Pampa, where it grows on rocks at altitudes of 600 – 3,000 m. The species was first named by Gillies, and described by Bentham in 1846.

== Description ==
Buddleja mendozensis is a dioecious shrub 0.2 – 2 m high with greyish bark. The young branches are subterete and tomentose, bearing leaves of very variable shape 0.5 – 8 cm long by 0.2 – 2 cm wide, membranaceous to subcoriaceous, glabrescent to tomentose above, and densely tomentose below. The yellow to orange inflorescence comprises 2 – 5 pairs of small globose heads in the axils of the terminal leaves; the corollas 3.5 – 4.5 mm long. Ploidy: 2n = 38.

== Cultivation ==
Buddleja mendozensis is not known to be in cultivation.
