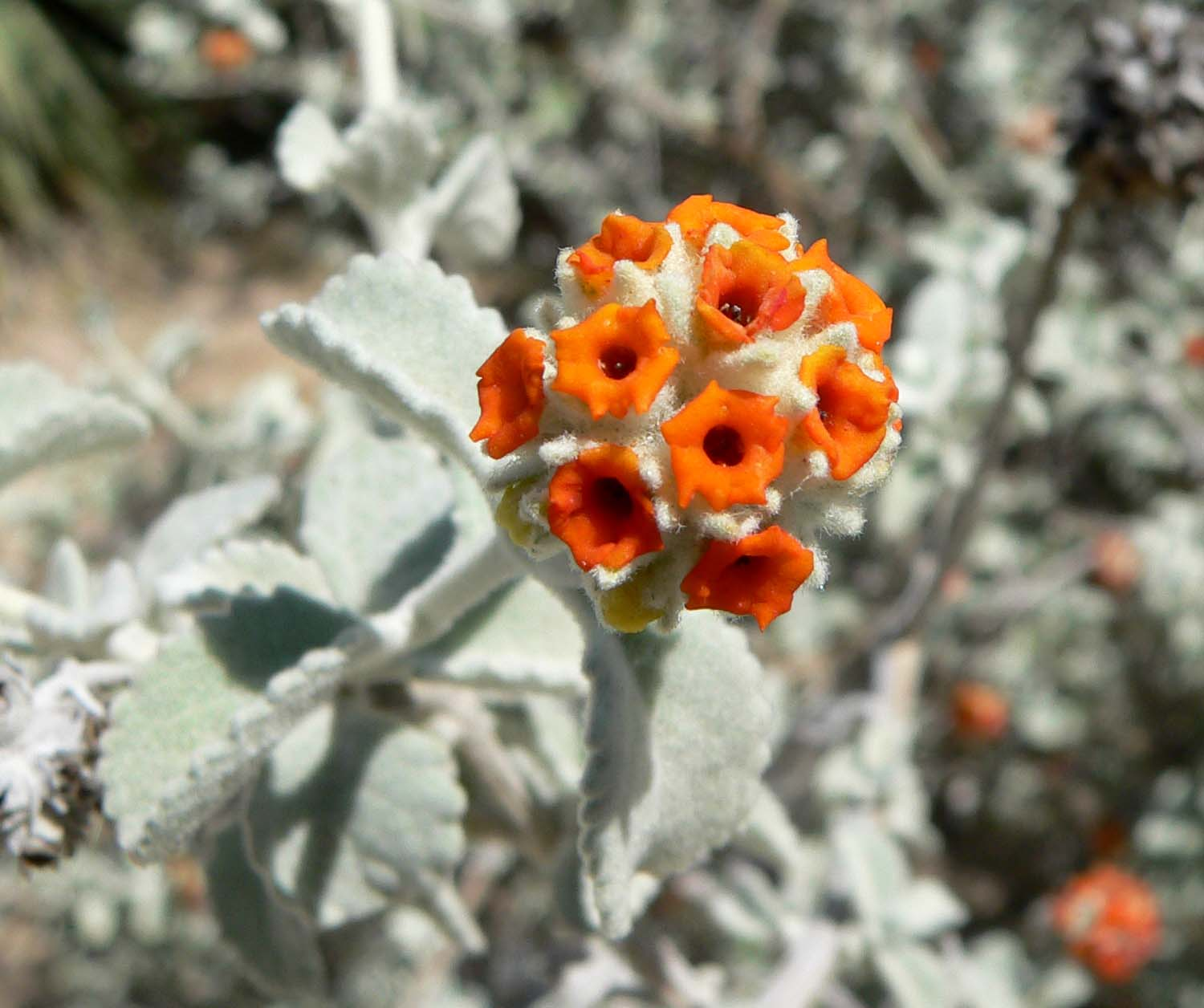

Scientific classification
- Kingdom: Plantae
- Clade: Tracheophytes
- Clade: Angiosperms
- Clade: Eudicots
- Clade: Asterids
- Order: Lamiales
- Family: Scrophulariaceae
- Genus: Buddleja
- Species: B. marrubiifolia

Binomial name
- Buddleja marrubiifolia Benth.

= Buddleja marrubiifolia =

Species of flowering plant

Buddleja marrubiifolia, commonly known as the woolly butterflybush, is a perennial shrub which is endemic to the Chihuahuan Desert from southern Texas to San Luis Potosí in Mexico, where it grows on limestone and gypsum soils in canyons and arroyos at elevations of 600 to 2,250 m (1,970 to 7,380 ft) elevation. The species was first named and described by George Bentham in 1846.

== Description ==
Buddleja marrubiifolia is a dioecious multi-branched shrub that is 0.5 to 2 m (1.6 to 6.6 ft) high with greyish to blackish rimose bark. The young branches are terete and tomentose, bearing ovate to rhomboid leaves that are 1 to 3 cm (0.39 to 1.18 in) long by 0.6 to 1.5 cm (0.24 to 0.59 in) wide, membranaceous to subcoriaceous, and densely tomentose on both surfaces. The inflorescence is a terminal globose head which is 0.8 to 1.2 cm (0.31 to 0.47 in) in diameter, comprising 35 flowers, deep yellow turning orange; the corollas are 2 to 3.5 mm (0.079 to 0.138 in) long. Ploidy: 2n = 38.

== Cultivation ==
The shrub is cultivated throughout Tucson, Arizona to attract butterflies. It is also planted as an ornamental in Hawaii. The shrub is in commerce in France, sold by several specialist alpine nurseries, and was introduced to the UK in February 2013, with one small plant acquired by the Longstock Park Nursery, NCCPG national buddleja collection holders, and another by the Royal Botanic Garden Edinburgh. Hardiness: USDA zone 7.

== Hybrids and cultivars ==
- 'Presidio' A relatively cold-hardy selection, the cultivar 'Presidio' was raised by Logan Calhoun of Texas. Hardiness: USDA zones 8–10.
