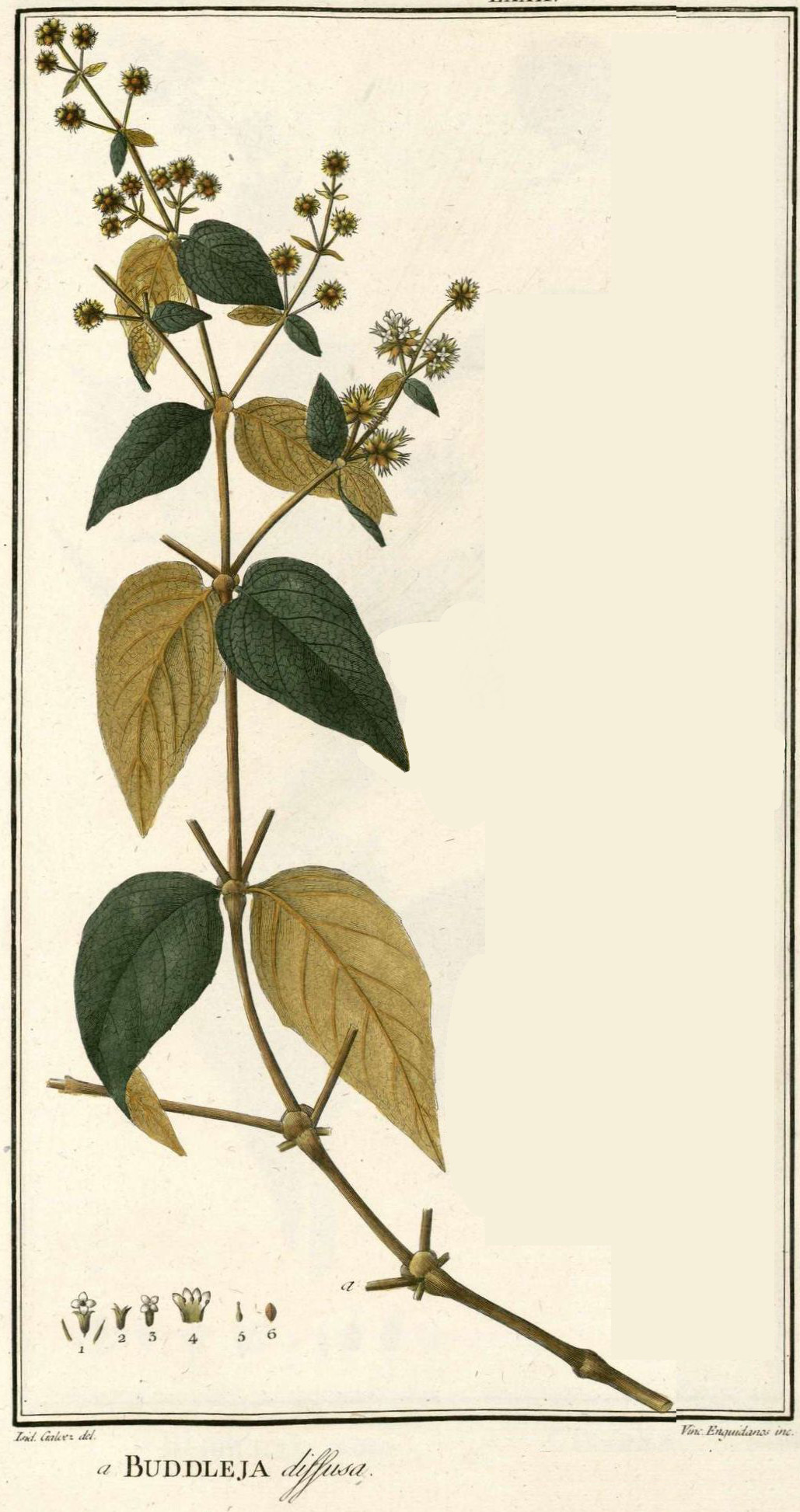

Scientific classification
- Kingdom: Plantae
- Clade: Tracheophytes
- Clade: Angiosperms
- Clade: Eudicots
- Clade: Asterids
- Order: Lamiales
- Family: Scrophulariaceae
- Genus: Buddleja
- Species: B. diffusa

Binomial name
- Buddleja diffusa Ruiz & Pav.

Synonyms
- Buddleja coroincense Rusby

= Buddleja diffusa =

Species of plant

Buddleja diffusa is a species of flowering plant in the family Scrophulariaceae. It is endemic to central Peru and northern Argentina, growing on dry hillsides above rivers and creeks at altitudes of 1000–1900 m; it was first described and named by Ruiz and Pavon in 1798.

== Description ==
Buddleja diffusa is a dioecious, scrambling, vine-like shrub 1–3.5 m high, with yellowish bark. The young branches are quadrangular, the younger growth covered with a white to buff tomentum. The sessile, membranaceous ovate or elliptic leaves 3–14 cm long by 2–8 cm wide, glabrescent above, tomentose below. The yellow inflorescences are 15–30 cm long, with one or two orders of branches; the flowers borne in capitate cymules, each 0.6–1 cm diameter, with 9–15 flowers; the corolla tubes are 3–3.5 mm long.

== Cultivation ==
The shrub is not known to be in cultivation.
