= Buddleja pichinchensis =

Scientific classification
- Kingdom: Plantae
- Clade: Tracheophytes
- Clade: Angiosperms
- Clade: Eudicots
- Clade: Asterids
- Order: Lamiales
- Family: Scrophulariaceae
- Genus: Buddleja
- Species: B. pichinchensis

Binomial name
- Buddleja pichinchensis Kunth

Synonyms
- Buddleja calycina Benth.; Buddleja ledifolia Kraenzl.

Species of flowering plant

Buddleja pichinchensis is endemic to the southern Cordillera Central of Colombia and the northern and central highlands of Ecuador, where it grows with Escallonia in páramo and subparamo regions at altitudes of 3,300 – 4,200 m. The species was first named and described by Kunth in 1818.

== Description ==
Buddleja pichinchensis is a dioecious shrub or small tree 3–6 m tall in the wild, with a blackish fissured bark, becoming increasingly gnarled with age. The young branches are terete and covered with a thick tomentum, bearing sessile or subsessile lanceolate coriaceous or subcoriaceous leaves, glabrescent above, with dense felt-like tomentum below. The faintly scented golden yellow inflorescences are 3–12 cm long, with 1–2 orders of branches, usually with 3–6 pairs of pendent pedunculate heads 1.2–2 cm in diameter, each head with 12–18 flowers, the corollas 3–5 mm long. Pollination is possibly by hummingbirds.

== Cultivation ==
The species was briefly in commerce in the UK (Fillpots Nursery, Colchester) circa 2003, and some specimens may survive there.
