= Buddleja nitida =

Conservation status
- Least Concern (IUCN 3.1)

Scientific classification
- Kingdom: Plantae
- Clade: Tracheophytes
- Clade: Angiosperms
- Clade: Eudicots
- Clade: Asterids
- Order: Lamiales
- Family: Scrophulariaceae
- Genus: Buddleja
- Species: B. nitida

Binomial name
- Buddleja nitida Benth.

Synonyms
- Buddleja alpina Oerst.

Species of flowering plant

Buddleja nitida is a species endemic to much of Central America, from southern Chiapas in Mexico south to the Sierra de Talamanca in northern Panama, where it grows on limestone slopes, in cloud forest, in clearings and pastures at altitudes of 2,000 – 4,000 m. The species was first named and described by Bentham in 1846.

== Description ==
Buddleja nitida is a tall shrub or small tree 4 – 15 m high, with a trunk < 60 cm in diameter, its exfoliating bark brown to black. The crown is dense and rounded, the young branches subquadrangular and tomentose, bearing oblong to lanceolate subcoriaceous leaves 3 – 10 cm long by 1 – 3.5 cm wide, glabrescent above, but with a strongly adpressed tomentum below. The leaves have petioles 1 – 3 cm long. The yellow to orange inflorescence is paniculate, with 3 – 4 orders of branches, subtended by leaves or small bracts, the flowers grouped 3 – 5 in small cymules, 5 – 7 mm in diameter; the corollas 2.5 – 3 mm long. Ploidy: 2n = 76.
