= Buddleja yunnanensis =

Scientific classification
- Kingdom: Plantae
- Clade: Tracheophytes
- Clade: Angiosperms
- Clade: Eudicots
- Clade: Asterids
- Order: Lamiales
- Family: Scrophulariaceae
- Genus: Buddleja
- Species: B. yunnanensis

Binomial name
- Buddleja yunnanensis Gagnep.

Species of plant

Buddleja yunnanensis is a shrub native to Yunnan and much of the rest of south-western China, where it grows on forest margins, thickets, and along streams at elevations of 1,000 – 2,500 m. The shrub was first described and named by Francois Gagnepain in 1915. This species is distinct from and does not resemble Buddleja nivea var. yunnanensis, although sometimes the latter is erroneously labelled as B. yunnanensis.

== Description ==
Buddleja yunnanensis is a small to medium shrub, 0.5–4 m tall with 4-angled branchlets, pubescent at first, becoming glabrescent. Leaves are opposite and the blade elliptic to narrowly ovate, up to 12 by 4.5 cm, with tomentose undersides and glabrous above. Inflorescences terminal and small, relatively few flowers, densely spicate, only up to 6 cm long. Corolla lilac, with the tube 9 mm long, the outside with dense stellate hairs. Stamens are inserted near base of corolla tube and the anthers ovate. Ovary ovoid, 3 × 2 mm, stellate tomentose except for lower third; stigma subcapitate. Capsules ellipsoid, stellate tomentose, approximately 4 × 3 mm. Seeds unwinged, ovoid to ellipsoid. Chromosome number is 2n = 38 (diploid).

== Cultivation ==
The species is not known to be in cultivation. Hardiness: USDA zone 8, based on its native range.
