= Buddleja candida =

Scientific classification
- Kingdom: Plantae
- Clade: Tracheophytes
- Clade: Angiosperms
- Clade: Eudicots
- Clade: Asterids
- Order: Lamiales
- Family: Scrophulariaceae
- Genus: Buddleja
- Species: B. candida

Binomial name
- Buddleja candida Dunn

Species of flowering plant

Buddleja candida is a small deciduous shrub widely distributed from north-east India through south east Xizang (Tibet) to the provinces of Sichuan and Yunnan in western China, growing on forest edges, in mountain thickets, and along riverbanks, at altitudes of 1000–2500 m. Named and described by Dunn in 1920, the shrub was introduced to cultivation in the west in 1928.

Leeuwenberg opined that the species needed further field study to confirm its specific distinction from B. nivea, to which it is very closely allied. Moreover, some herbaria specimens examined he considered possible hybrids of B. asiatica and B. macrostachya.

== Description ==
Buddleja candida grows to 1–2 m in height in the wild. The foliage is silvery-buff when juvenile, becoming glabrous and rugose with age, the leaves oblong with acuminate apices, 12–24 cm long by 3–6 cm wide, with a 0.5 cm – 1.0 cm petiole, the margins serrate to crenate. The violet inflorescences are pendulous terminal panicles comprising several interrupted spikey thyrsi, 8–20 cm by 3–11 cm, the corollas ca. 6 mm long, stellate tomentose outside. The shrub flowers from April to October. Ploidy 2n = 76 (tetraploid).

== Cultivation ==
Buddleja candida remains rare in cultivation. In the UK, a specimen is grown as part of the NCCPG national collection at Longstock Park Nursery, near Stockbridge, Hampshire. Hardiness: USDA zones 9–10.
