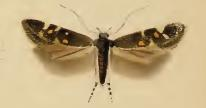
- Chrysoesthia sexguttella

Scientific classification
- Domain: Eukaryota
- Kingdom: Animalia
- Phylum: Arthropoda
- Class: Insecta
- Order: Lepidoptera
- Family: Gelechiidae
- Genus: Chrysoesthia
- Species: C. stipelloides

Binomial name
- Chrysoesthia stipelloides (Janse, 1950)

Synonyms
- Microsetia stipelloides Janse, 1950

= Chrysoesthia stipelloides =

Species of moth

Chrysoesthia stipelloides is a moth of the family Gelechiidae. It is found in South Africa (KwaZulu-Natal) and Madagascar.

This species has a wingspan of 10-11mm and was formerly confused by Edward Meyrick with Chrysoesthia stipella (now considered as a junior-synonyme of Chrysoesthia sexguttella) from which it differs by genitalia and that has less developed yellow maculae.

== Biology ==
The larvae were reared in Madagascar by R.Paulian on Achyranthes aspera.
