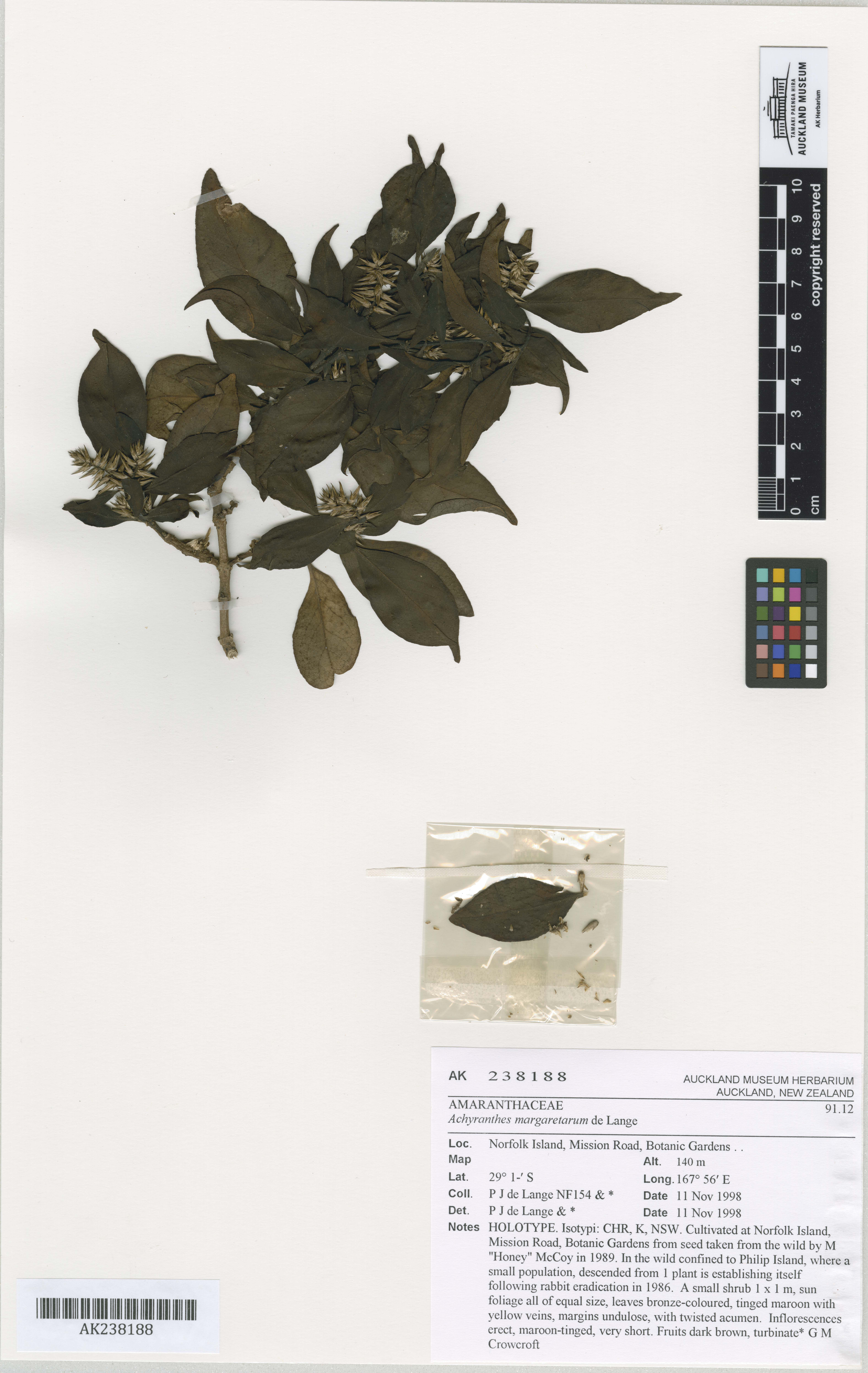

Conservation status
- Critically endangered (EPBC Act)

Scientific classification
- Kingdom: Plantae
- Clade: Tracheophytes
- Clade: Angiosperms
- Clade: Eudicots
- Order: Caryophyllales
- Family: Amaranthaceae
- Genus: Achyranthes
- Species: A. margaretarum

Binomial name
- Achyranthes margaretarum de Lange & Murray

= Achyranthes margaretarum =

Species of flowering plant

Achyranthes margaretarum is a species of plant belonging to the family Amaranthaceae. It is endemic to Phillip Island, close to Norfolk Island in the south west Pacific Ocean, where it was discovered during the 1980s after rabbits had been eradicated from the island. This provides dramatic evidence of the value of the eradication program. It is considered critically endangered due to its very small population size – fewer than 20 mature individuals were known, in a single location on Phillip Island, in 2003. In 2009 Mills identified 22 plants on Phillip Island, including planted specimens, only nine higher than 50 cm.

This plant is similar to Achyranthes arborescens, an endemic from neighbouring Norfolk Island, but is a smaller, more compact shrub growing up to 2m tall with a 2m spread. A. margaretarum also differs in having small, rather fleshy, bronze-green leaves with yellow veins; small, erect inflorescences carrying just a few maroon-coloured flowers; and small top-shaped (rather than cylindrical) fruit.
