= Chrysoesthia parilis =

Scientific classification
- Kingdom: Animalia
- Phylum: Arthropoda
- Class: Insecta
- Order: Lepidoptera
- Family: Gelechiidae
- Genus: Chrysoesthia
- Species: C. parilis

Binomial name
- Chrysoesthia parilis (Vári, 1963)

Synonyms
- Microsetia parilis Vári, 1963

Species of moth

Chrysoesthia parilis is a moth of the family Gelechiidae. It is found in Ethiopia.

The larvae feed on Achyranthes aspera.
