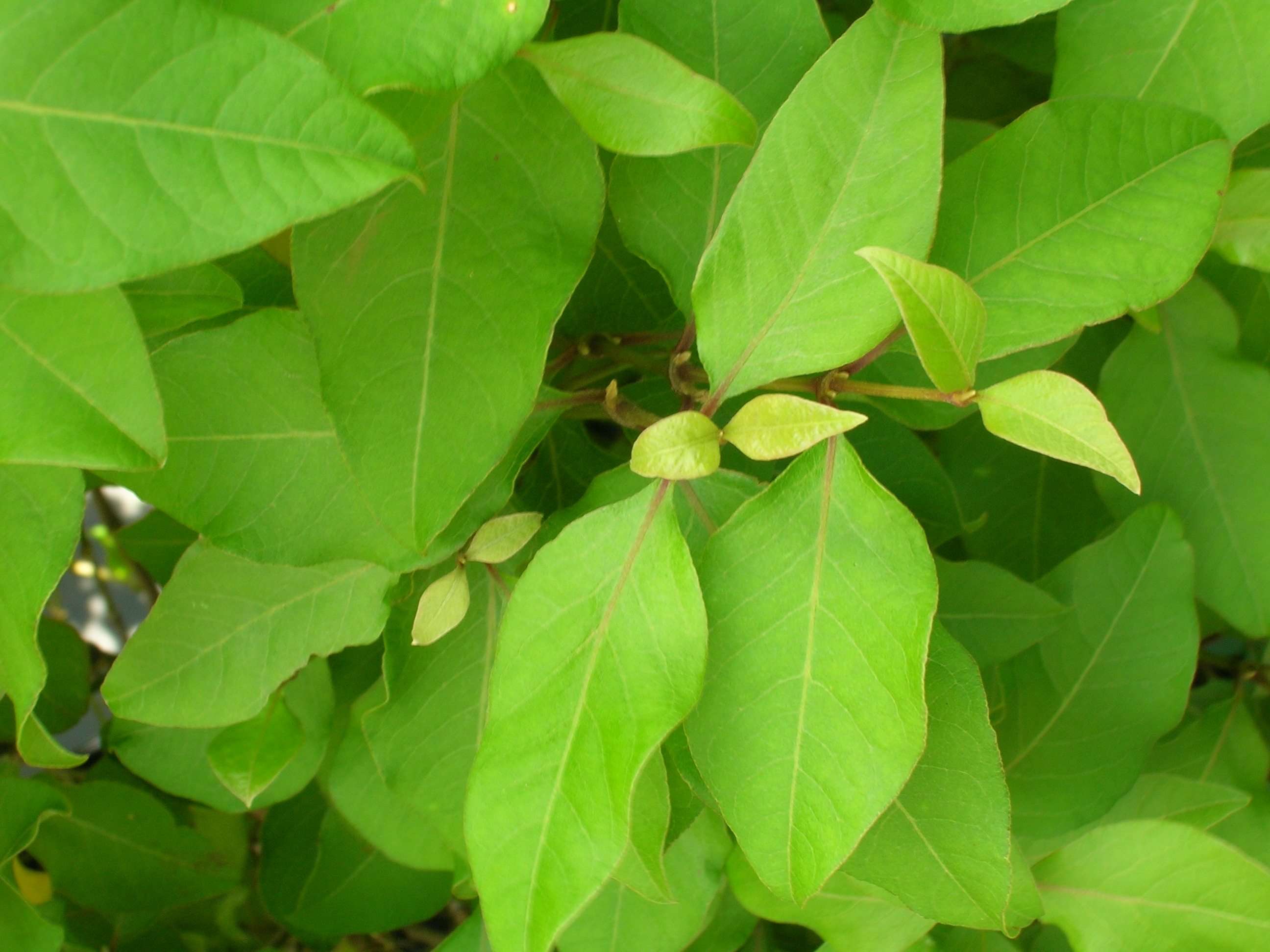

Conservation status
- Imperiled (NatureServe)

- Endangered (IUCN 3.1)

Scientific classification
- Kingdom: Plantae
- Clade: Tracheophytes
- Clade: Angiosperms
- Clade: Eudicots
- Order: Caryophyllales
- Family: Amaranthaceae
- Genus: Achyranthes
- Species: A. humilis

Binomial name
- Achyranthes humilis (Hillebr.) Di Vincenzo, Berends., Wondafr. & Borsch

Synonyms
- Nototrichium humile Hillebr.; Psilotrichum humile (Hillebr.) Drake

= Achyranthes humilis =

Species of flowering plant

Achyranthes humilis is a rare species of flowering plant in the family Amaranthaceae known by the common names kaala rockwort and kulu'i. It is endemic to Hawaii, where it is now limited to the island of Oahu, having been extirpated from Maui. It is a federally listed endangered species of the United States.

The main threat to the species is fire. Most populations occur on the Makua Military Reservation in the Waianae Range of Oahu, in territory at high risk for fire. Other threats include damage to the habitat by feral goats, and competition with introduced species of plants, such as pamakani haole (Ageratina adenophora), spreading mist flower (Ageratina riparia), dog tail (Buddleja asiatica), wait-a-bit (Caesalpinia decapetala), ti (Cordyline fruticosa), silk oak (Grevillea robusta), koa haole (Leucaena leucocephala), pride of India (Melia azedarach), and molasses grass (Melinis minutiflora).

This shrub grows upright or trailing and produces slender spikes of flowers.

The species was first described as Nototrichium humile by William Hillebrand in 1888. In 2024 Vanessa Di Vincenzo et al. placed the species in genus Achyranthes as A. humilis.
