= Achyranthes aspera var. sicula =

- Achyranthes annua Dinter; Achyranthes argentea Lam.; Achyranthes argentea Thwaites; Achyranthes argentea var. virgata (Desf. ex Poir.) Moq.; Achyranthes aspera var. villososericea Suess.; Achyranthes crispa Desf. ex Poir.; Achyranthes sicula (L.) All.; Achyranthes virgata Desf. ex Poir.; Cadelaria argentea (Lam.) Raf.; Cadelaria sicula (L.) Raf.

Scientific classification
- Kingdom: Plantae
- Clade: Tracheophytes
- Clade: Angiosperms
- Clade: Eudicots
- Order: Caryophyllales
- Family: Amaranthaceae
- Genus: Achyranthes
- Species: A. aspera
- Variety: A. a. var. sicula

Trinomial name
- Achyranthes aspera var. sicula L.

Variety of flowering plant

Achyranthes aspera var. sicula is a plant variety in the family pigweed.
