= Chrysoesthia isocharis =

Scientific classification
- Kingdom: Animalia
- Phylum: Arthropoda
- Class: Insecta
- Order: Lepidoptera
- Family: Gelechiidae
- Genus: Chrysoesthia
- Species: C. isocharis

Binomial name
- Chrysoesthia isocharis (Vári, 1963)

Synonyms
- Microsetia isocharis Vári, 1963

Species of moth

Chrysoesthia isocharis is a moth of the family Gelechiidae. It is found in South Africa.

The larvae feed on Achyranthes aspera.
