= B. asiatica =

B. asiatica may refer to:

- Barringtonia asiatica, the sea poison tree or fish poison tree, a tree species native to mangrove habitats on the tropical coasts and islands of the Indian Ocean and western Pacific Ocean
- Buddleja asiatica, a tender deciduous shrub species native to a vast area of the East Indies

== See also ==
- List of Latin and Greek words commonly used in systematic names#Asiatica
