= Kului =

Kului may refer to:

- Nototrichium, a genus of flowering plants in the family Amaranthaceae, members of which are known as kuluʻī in Hawaiian
- Kului language, a language in northern India
