= Chrysoesthia eppelsheimi =

Scientific classification
- Domain: Eukaryota
- Kingdom: Animalia
- Phylum: Arthropoda
- Class: Insecta
- Order: Lepidoptera
- Family: Gelechiidae
- Genus: Chrysoesthia
- Species: C. eppelsheimi

Binomial name
- Chrysoesthia eppelsheimi (Staudinger, 1885)

Synonyms
- Nannodia eppelsheimi Staudinger, 1885; Chrysopora eppelsheimi; Microsetia eppelsheimi

Species of moth

Chrysoesthia eppelsheimi is a moth of the family Gelechiidae. It is found in France, Germany and Switzerland.

The wingspan is 6–8 mm.

The larvae feed on Silene flavescens, Silene nutans and Silene vulgaris. They mine the leaves of their host plant. Larvae can be found from June to September.
