= Achyranthes talbotii =

Conservation status
- Near Threatened (IUCN 3.1)

Scientific classification
- Kingdom: Plantae
- Clade: Tracheophytes
- Clade: Angiosperms
- Clade: Eudicots
- Order: Caryophyllales
- Family: Amaranthaceae
- Genus: Achyranthes
- Species: A. talbotii

Binomial name
- Achyranthes talbotii Hutch. & Dalziel

Species of flowering plant

Achyranthes talbotii is a species of plant in the family Amaranthaceae. It is found in Cameroon and Nigeria. Its natural habitats are subtropical or tropical moist lowland forests and rivers. It is threatened by habitat loss.
