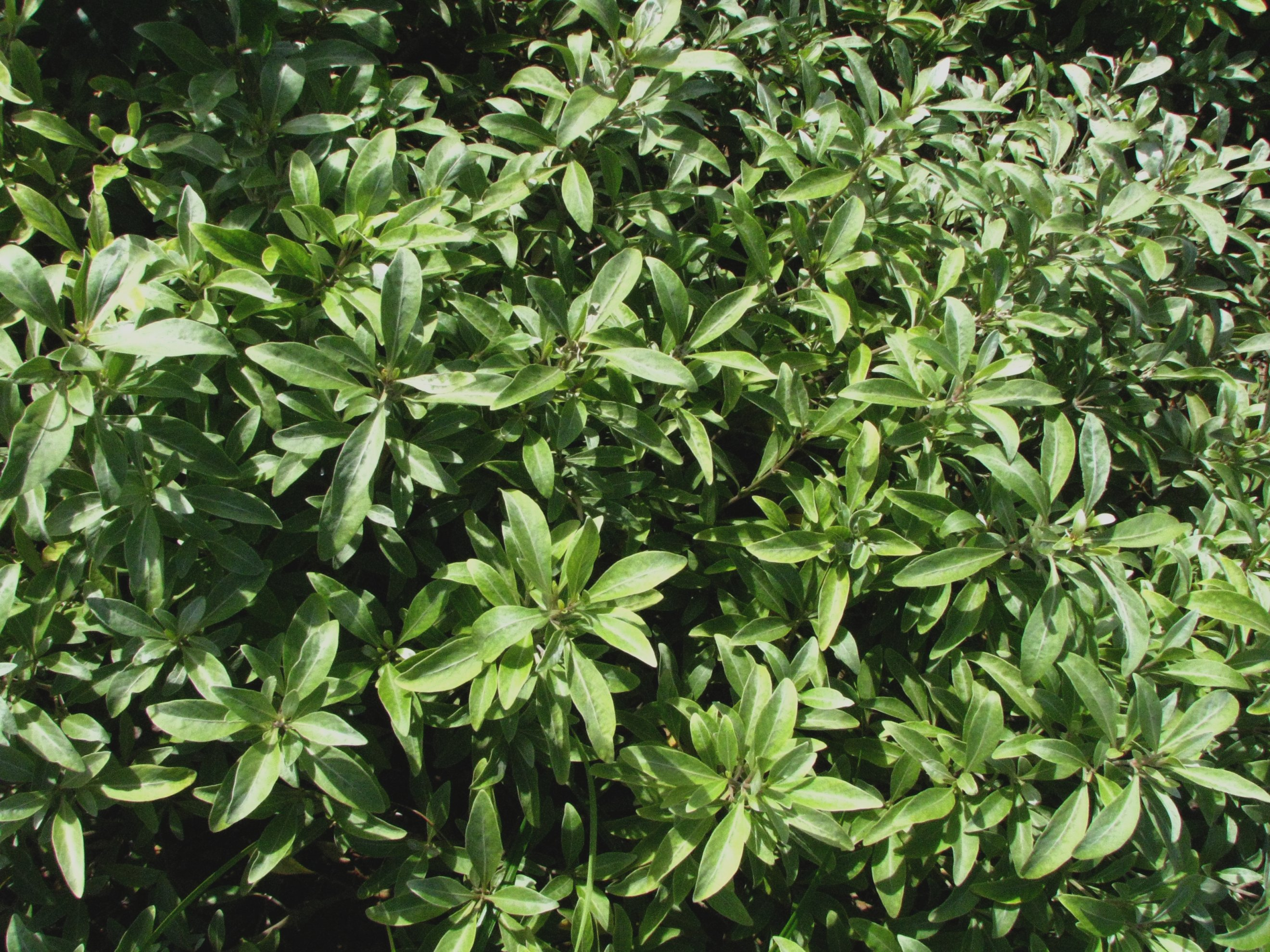
- Achyranthes divaricata growing in Limahuli Garden and Preserve

Conservation status
- Critically Endangered (IUCN 3.1)

- Critically Imperiled (NatureServe)

Scientific classification
- Kingdom: Plantae
- Clade: Tracheophytes
- Clade: Angiosperms
- Clade: Eudicots
- Order: Caryophyllales
- Family: Amaranthaceae
- Genus: Achyranthes
- Species: A. divaricata

Binomial name
- Achyranthes divaricata (Lorence) Di Vincenzo, Berends., Wondafr. & Borsch

Synonyms
- Nototrichium divaricatum Lorence

= Achyranthes divaricata =

Species of shrub

Achyranthes divaricata (synonym Nototrichium divaricatum), also known as Na Pali rockwort or kuluʻī (Hawaiian), is a critically endangered perennial shrub in the pigweed family, Amaranthaceae, that is endemic to the island of Kauaʻi in Hawaii. It can only be found in three valleys on the northwestern end of the island, where it grows on north-facing cliffs and ridges.

Achyranthes divaricata are densely branching shrubs that can grow up to 2–6 feet (0.61–1.83 m) tall, with green leaves covered with silvery-white hairs. Leaves are oppositely arranged, with leaf blades 3–7.5 cm (1.2–3.0 in) long and 1–4.6 cm (0.39–1.81 in) wide. Inflorescences bear several spikes, and are terminal and usually solitary, rarely 2 or 3 together, and compoundly branched. Each spike bears 8–30 small flowers. There are possibly fewer than 3,000 A. divaricata plants in existence.

This species was first described as Nototrichium divaricatum by David H. Lorence in 1996. In 2024 Vanessa Di Vincenzo et al. placed the species in genus Achyranthes as A. divaricata.

== Distribution and habitat ==
Achyranthes divaricata is endemic to cliffs and ridges on the northwestern end of Kaua'i, particularly in the Na Pali coast. It grows at elevations of 600 to 1,100 metres (1,970 to 3,610 ft) in precipitous slopes of pocketed forests and vertical cliffs
