= Chrysoesthia mimetis =

Scientific classification
- Kingdom: Animalia
- Phylum: Arthropoda
- Clade: Pancrustacea
- Class: Insecta
- Order: Lepidoptera
- Family: Gelechiidae
- Genus: Chrysoesthia
- Species: C. mimetis

Binomial name
- Chrysoesthia mimetis (Vári, 1963)

Synonyms
- Microsetia mimetis Vári, 1963

Species of moth

Chrysoethia mimentis is a species of moth endemic to South Africa which belongs to the genus Chrysoesthia.
