= Chrysoesthia versicolorella =

Scientific classification
- Domain: Eukaryota
- Kingdom: Animalia
- Phylum: Arthropoda
- Class: Insecta
- Order: Lepidoptera
- Family: Gelechiidae
- Genus: Chrysoesthia
- Species: C. versicolorella

Binomial name
- Chrysoesthia versicolorella (Kearfott, 1908)

Synonyms
- Chrysopora versicolorella Kearfott, 1908

Species of moth

Chrysoesthia versicolorella is a moth of the family Gelechiidae. It was described by William D. Kearfott in 1908. It is found in North America, where it has been recorded from California.

The wingspan is 9–10 mm. The white ground color occurs as follows: on the lower three fifths of the wing from the base nearly to the middle, a large triangular spot on the middle of the costa which sends an attenuated fascia to the dorsum, this is largely iridescent. There is also a pure white spot on the costa before the apex, a smaller one below it on the middle of the termen and another below this above the tornus. In some specimens these spots are so nearly connected together that they form a very angulated terminal fascia. Above the white inner patch is a blackish patch interrupted with pale blue metallic scales, a broad ovate spot of this color divides it beyond its middle, touching the costa and continuing as an iridescent fascia over the white area to the dorsum. Between the middle and terminal whitish spots or fasciae is an irregular patch of olivaceous ocherous, more or less overlaid with metallic pale blue or pink on the lower and outer spurs. There is an oblique blackish-brown streak involving the apex and apical cilia, the inner end of this indents the outer white costal spot and the one below it. The hindwings are pale shining gray.
