= Chrysoesthia atriplicella =

Scientific classification
- Domain: Eukaryota
- Kingdom: Animalia
- Phylum: Arthropoda
- Class: Insecta
- Order: Lepidoptera
- Family: Gelechiidae
- Genus: Chrysoesthia
- Species: C. atriplicella

Binomial name
- Chrysoesthia atriplicella (Amsel, 1939)

Synonyms
- Chrysophora atriplicella Amsel, 1939; Microsetia atriplicella

Species of moth

Chrysoesthia atriplicella is a moth of the family Gelechiidae. It is found in southern France and on Sardinia.

The larvae feed on Atriplex halimus. They mine the leaves of their host plant. Larvae can be found from April to May.
