= Achyranthes atollensis =

Hawaiʻi chaff flower

Conservation status
- Extinct (1964) (IUCN 3.1)

Scientific classification
- Kingdom: Plantae
- Clade: Tracheophytes
- Clade: Angiosperms
- Clade: Eudicots
- Order: Caryophyllales
- Family: Amaranthaceae
- Genus: Achyranthes
- Species: †A. atollensis

Binomial name
- †Achyranthes atollensis H.St.John
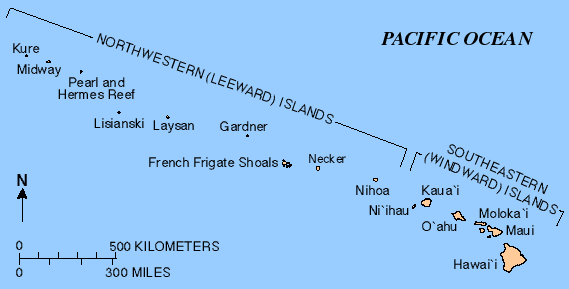
- Hawaiian Islands, showing Kure, Midway, Laysan and Pearl and Hermes to the west

Synonyms
- A. splendens var. atollensis (H.St.John) Govaerts

Extinct species of flowering plant

Achyranthes atollensis (also called atoll achyranthes or Hawaiʻi chaff flower) was a species of plant in the family Amaranthaceae. It was endemic to the Northwestern Hawaiian Islands of Kure, Midway, Laysan and the Pearl and Hermes Atoll. Its natural habitat was sandy shores. It became extinct due to habitat loss (residential, commercial and military installation development) and the introduction of non-native species, and was last seen in 1964. It was a perennial shrub living in dry shrublands on calcareous sand and atolls.

== See also ==
- List of species of the Northwestern Hawaiian Islands
