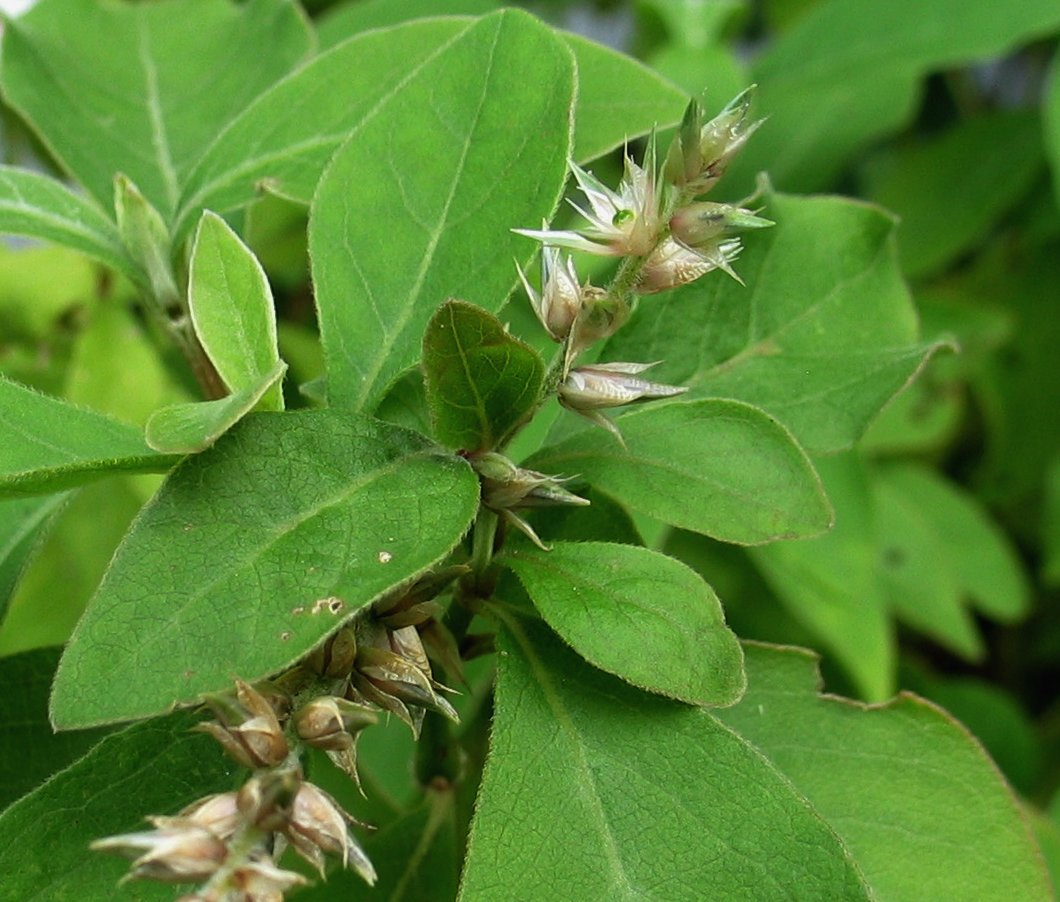
- Flower

Conservation status
- Endangered (IUCN 3.1)

Scientific classification
- Kingdom: Plantae
- Clade: Tracheophytes
- Clade: Angiosperms
- Clade: Eudicots
- Order: Caryophyllales
- Family: Amaranthaceae
- Genus: Achyranthes
- Species: A. mutica

Binomial name
- Achyranthes mutica A.Gray

= Achyranthes mutica =

Species of flowering plant

Achyranthes mutica (also called blunt chaff flower) is a species of plant in the family Amaranthaceae. It is endemic to Hawaii. It is a perennial shrub that grows up to 2 ft (0.61 m) tall. Its natural habitats are dry forests and subtropical or tropical dry shrubland. It is threatened by habitat loss.
