= Chrysoesthia verrucosa =

Scientific classification
- Kingdom: Animalia
- Phylum: Arthropoda
- Class: Insecta
- Order: Lepidoptera
- Family: Gelechiidae
- Genus: Chrysoesthia
- Species: C. verrucosa

Binomial name
- Chrysoesthia verrucosa Tokár, 1999

Species of moth

Chrysoesthia verrucosa is a moth of the family Gelechiidae. It is found in the Czech Republic, Slovakia, Austria, Hungary and northern Italy. There are also records from Germany and it is possibly also present in Poland.

The wingspan is 8–9.5 mm.

The larvae feed on Chenopodium species. They mine the leaves of their host plant. Larvae can be found in early August.
