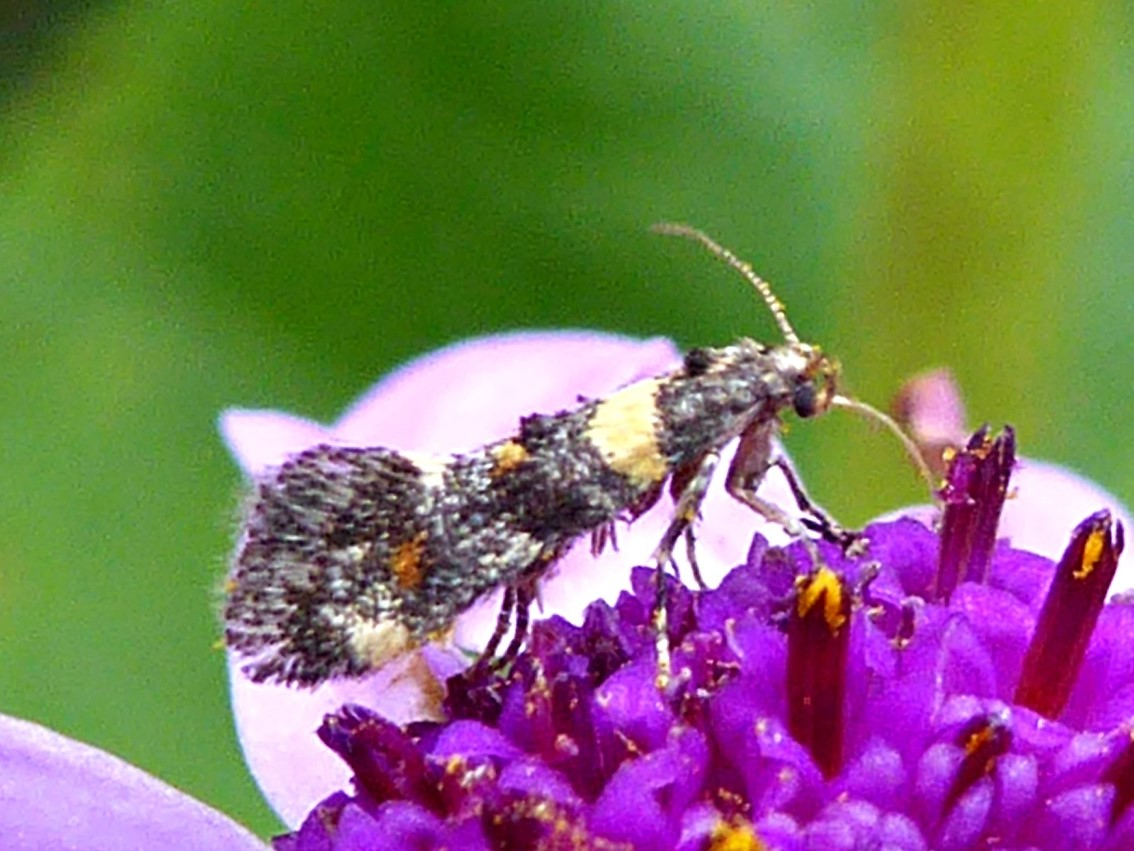

Scientific classification
- Domain: Eukaryota
- Kingdom: Animalia
- Phylum: Arthropoda
- Class: Insecta
- Order: Lepidoptera
- Family: Gelechiidae
- Genus: Chrysoesthia
- Species: C. boseae

Binomial name
- Chrysoesthia boseae (Walsingham, 1908)

Synonyms
- Chrysopora boseae Walsingham, 1908; Microsetia boseae; Chrysoesthia bosae

= Chrysoesthia boseae =

Species of moth

Chrysoesthia boseae is a species of moth in the family Gelechiidae. It is found on the Canary Islands.

The wingspan is 7–8 mm.
