= Chrysoesthia halymella =

Scientific classification
- Kingdom: Animalia
- Phylum: Arthropoda
- Clade: Pancrustacea
- Class: Insecta
- Order: Lepidoptera
- Family: Gelechiidae
- Genus: Chrysoesthia
- Species: C. halymella

Binomial name
- Chrysoesthia halymella (Amsel & Hering, 1931)

Synonyms
- Chrysophora halymella Amsel & Hering, 1931

Species of moth

Chrysoesthia halymella is a moth of the family Gelechiidae. It is found in Palestine.

The larvae feed on Atriplex halimus.
