= Chrysoesthia candidella =

Scientific classification
- Domain: Eukaryota
- Kingdom: Animalia
- Phylum: Arthropoda
- Class: Insecta
- Order: Lepidoptera
- Family: Gelechiidae
- Genus: Chrysoesthia
- Species: C. candidella

Binomial name
- Chrysoesthia candidella (Chrétien, 1915)

Synonyms
- Guebla candidella Chrétien, 1915

Species of moth

Chrysoesthia candidella is a moth of the family Gelechiidae. It is found in Tunisia.

The wingspan is about 13 mm. The forewings are white, with black scales forming a triangular at the costa. The hindwings are yellowish-white.
