= Chrysoesthia heringi =

Scientific classification
- Kingdom: Animalia
- Phylum: Arthropoda
- Class: Insecta
- Order: Lepidoptera
- Family: Gelechiidae
- Genus: Chrysoesthia
- Species: C. heringi

Binomial name
- Chrysoesthia heringi (Kuroko, 1961)

Synonyms
- Microsetia heringi Kuroko, 1961

Species of moth

Chrysoesthia heringi is a moth of the family Gelechiidae. It is found in Japan.

The wingspan is 7–8.5 mm.
