= Chrysoesthia lingulacella =

Scientific classification
- Kingdom: Animalia
- Phylum: Arthropoda
- Clade: Pancrustacea
- Class: Insecta
- Order: Lepidoptera
- Family: Gelechiidae
- Genus: Chrysoesthia
- Species: C. lingulacella

Binomial name
- Chrysoesthia lingulacella (Clemens, 1860)

Synonyms
- Nomia lingulacella Clemens, 1860; Gelechia arminiella Frey & Boll, 1878

Species of moth

Chrysoesthia lingulacella, the silver-banded moth, is a moth of the family Gelechiidae. It was described by James Brackenridge Clemens in 1860. It is found in North America, where it has been recorded from Alberta, Arizona, California, Illinois, Indiana, Iowa, Maine, New Hampshire, Quebec and Texas.

The forewings are golden yellow with a dark golden-brown patch at the base of the costa, not extended beyond the fold, and margined behind and beneath with iridescent silvery. On the inner margin near the base and extended to the middle of the margin is a rather long patch of the same hue, with an iridescent silvery internal patch and touched exteriorly with the same hue. A large trapezoidal golden-brown patch on the middle of the costa is margined internally by a rather broad iridescent silvery streak, which is slightly dark margined internally, having also an external silvery streak produced in the middle of the wing toward the apex and beneath it, at its interior angle, a brownish-silvery blotch, pointing to the inner margin at the beginning of the cilia. In the apical portion of the wing is a silvery streak, dark margined on both sides behind, pointing into the costal cilia above the apex. The costa from the trapezoidal patch to the tip, is touched with dark brown. The hindwings are dark brownish.

The larvae feed on Chenopodium album. They mine the leaves of their host plant. Pupation takes place outside of the mine.
