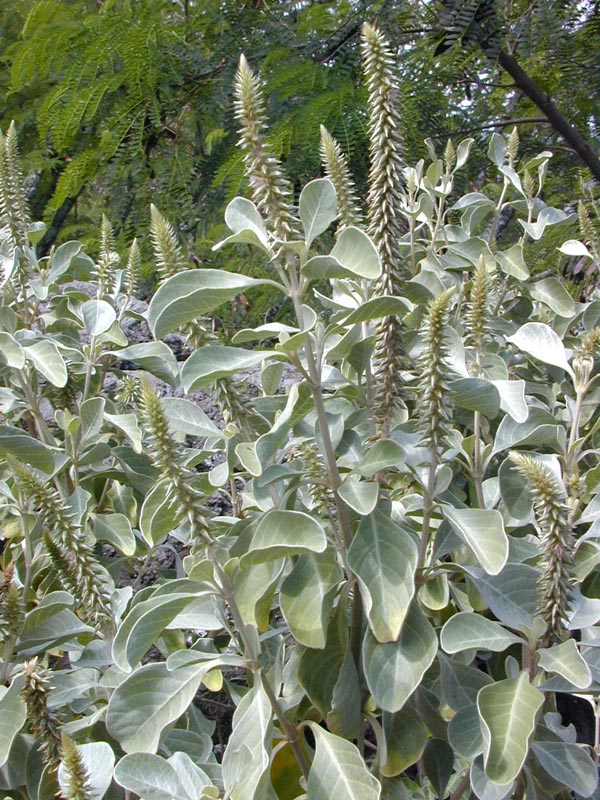

Conservation status
- Vulnerable (IUCN 3.1)

Scientific classification
- Kingdom: Plantae
- Clade: Tracheophytes
- Clade: Angiosperms
- Clade: Eudicots
- Order: Caryophyllales
- Family: Amaranthaceae
- Genus: Achyranthes
- Species: A. splendens

Binomial name
- Achyranthes splendens Mart. ex Moq.

= Achyranthes splendens =

Species of flowering plant

Achyranthes splendens (ʻEwa hinahina; also called Maui chaff flower, round chaff flower, round-leaf chaff flower, or round-leaved chaff flower) is a species of flowering plant in the pigweed family, Amaranthaceae, that is endemic to Hawaiʻi. Its natural habitats are dry forests, low shrublands, and sandy shores. It is threatened by habitat loss.

== Description ==
There are two main variations of the plant: Achyranthes splendens var. splendens, which is a taller shrub with bigger obovate leaves, and Achyranthes splendens var. rotundata, which is a shorter shrub with smaller orbicular leaves. The typical mature size is between 2 and 6 feet (0.6-1.8 m), but larger plants can grow up to 10 feet (3.0 m) tall. This shrub has oppositely arranged light green leaves that appear grey due to the tiny hairs on it. The name hinahina or ‘ahinahina is often used to refer to plants with this feature. A distinctive trait of this plant is its flower spike that emerges from the top of the stem.

== Distribution and habitat ==
A. splendens var. splendens is found naturally on Lānaʻi and Maui, while A. splendens var. rotundata is considered endangered. Wild populations of A. splendens var. rotundata are closely monitored in locations on Oʻahu, including Kaʻena Point, Kalaeloa, Mākaha, Kahuku, and Campbell Industrial, as well as at Mokio on Moloka‘i, after going extinct on Lāna‘i. Historically, A. splendens var. rotundata was often found around the ‘Ewa Plain area, giving it the nickname, ‘Ewa hinahina. This variety is salt- and drought-tolerant and can be propagated through seeds or cuttings, but permits are required to grow them commercially due to their endangered status.

== Human use ==
This plant has been used in landscaping and ecological restoration projects to increase native plant diversity, especially in Kalaeloa. The spikes and leaves of the plant can also be used when making lei in wili or haku.
