= Chrysoesthia gaditella =

Scientific classification
- Kingdom: Animalia
- Phylum: Arthropoda
- Class: Insecta
- Order: Lepidoptera
- Family: Gelechiidae
- Genus: Chrysoesthia
- Species: C. gaditella

Binomial name
- Chrysoesthia gaditella (Staudinger, 1859)

Synonyms
- Gelechia gaditella Staudinger, 1859; Anaphaula gaditella

Species of moth

Chrysoesthia gaditella is a moth of the family Gelechiidae. It is found in Portugal, Spain and Algeria.

The wingspan is 8.5–9 mm.

The larvae feed on Atriplex halimus. They mine the leaves of their host plant.
