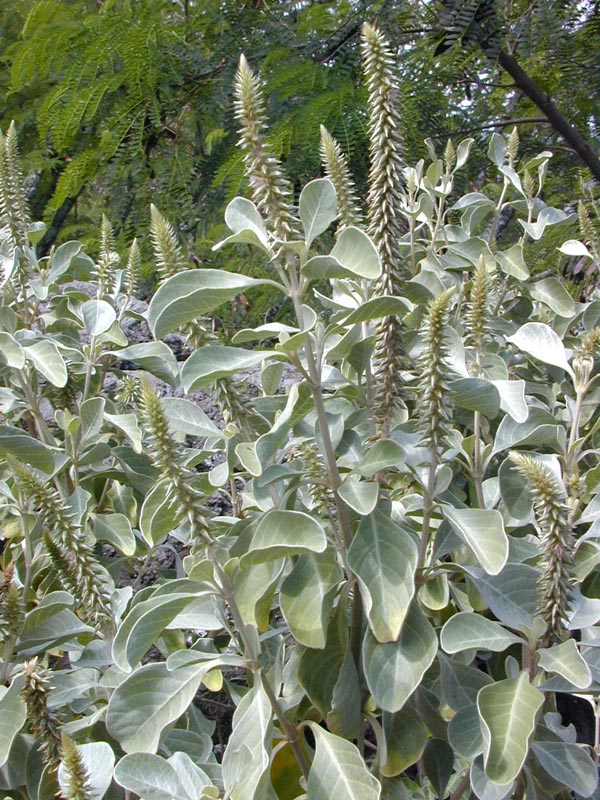
- A. splendens

Scientific classification
- Kingdom: Plantae
- Clade: Tracheophytes
- Clade: Angiosperms
- Clade: Eudicots
- Order: Caryophyllales
- Family: Amaranthaceae
- Subfamily: Amaranthoideae
- Genus: Achyranthes; L.

Species
- See text

Synonyms
- Achiranthes P.Browne, orth. var.; Achyropsis (Moq.) Hook.f.; Amorgine Raf.; Cadelari Adans.; Cadelaria Raf.; Cyathula Lour.; Nototrichium Hillebr.; Stachyarpagophora Vaill. ex M.Gómez

= Achyranthes =

Genus of flowering plants

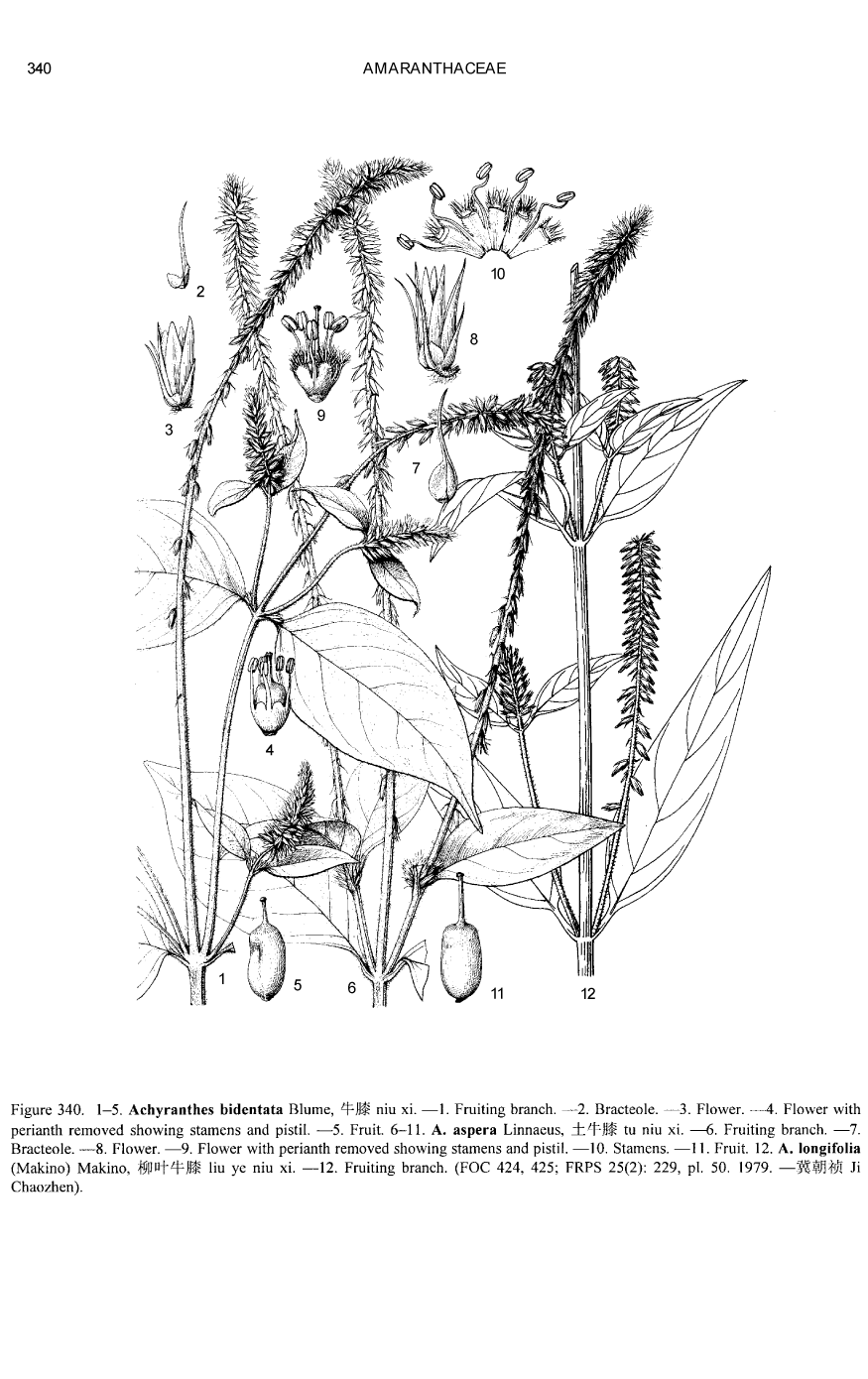
rightA. bidentata (1–5), A. aspera (6–11) & A. longifolia (12)

Achyranthes is a genus of medicinal and ornamental plants in the amaranth family, Amaranthaceae. Chaff flower is a common name for plants in this genus. The Hawaiian species (A. divaricata, A. humile, and A. sandwicensis) are known in Hawaiian as kuluʻī.

A 2024 morphological and phylogenetic analysis by Vanessa Di Vincenzo et al. merged the genus Achyropsis and the Hawaiian genus Nototrichium into Achyranthes to make it monophyletic. The genus is characterized by solitary, fertile flowers.

== Species ==
33 species are accepted.

- Achyranthes abyssinica Nees
- Achyranthes ancistrophora C.C.Towns.
- Achyranthes annua Dinter
- Achyranthes arborescens R.Br.
- Achyranthes aspera L. (= A. argentea) (Sanskrit : apamarg (अपामार्ग))
- Achyranthes atollensis (extinct)
- Achyranthes avicularis E.Mey. ex Moq.
- Achyranthes bidentata Blume (synonym Achyranthes japonica (Miq.) Nakai)
- Achyranthes borbonica Willd. ex Schult.
- Achyranthes coynei Santapau
- Achyranthes diandra Roxb.
- Achyranthes divaricata (Lorence) Di Vincenzo, Berends., Wondafr. & Borsch
- Achyranthes fasciculata (Suess.) C.C.Towns.
- Achyranthes fruticulosa (C.B.Clarke) Di Vincenzo, Berends., Wondafr. & Borsch
- Achyranthes graminiformis Di Vincenzo, Berends., Wondafr. & Borsch
- Achyranthes humilis (Hillebr.) Di Vincenzo, Berends., Wondafr. & Borsch
- Achyranthes laniceps (C.B.Clarke) Di Vincenzo, Berends., Wondafr. & Borsch
- Achyranthes leptostachya E.Mey. ex Meisn.
- Achyranthes mangarevica Suess.
- Achyranthes marchionica R.Br.
- Achyranthes margaretarum de Lange
- Achyranthes mauritiana Moq.
- Achyranthes mutica A.Gray ex H.Mann
- Achyranthes porphyrostachya Wall. ex Moq.
- Achyranthes sandwicensis (A.Gray) Di Vincenzo, Berends., Wondafr. & Borsch
- Achyranthes schinzii (Standl.) Cufod.
- Achyranthes seychellensis Sukhor.
- Achyranthes shahii M.R.Almeida & S.M.Almeida
- Achyranthes sicula (L.) All.
- Achyranthes splendens Mart. ex Moq.
- Achyranthes talbotii Hutch. & Dalziel
- Achyranthes velutina Hook. & Arn.
- Achyranthes viridis Lopr.
- Achyranthes viriditepala Di Vincenzo, Berends., Wondafr. & Borsch
