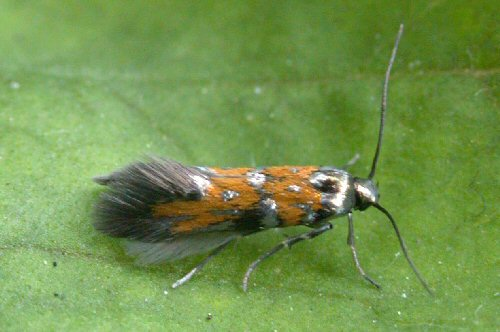

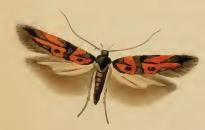

Scientific classification
- Domain: Eukaryota
- Kingdom: Animalia
- Phylum: Arthropoda
- Class: Insecta
- Order: Lepidoptera
- Family: Gelechiidae
- Genus: Chrysoesthia
- Species: C. drurella

Binomial name
- Chrysoesthia drurella (Fabricius, 1775)

Synonyms
- Tinea drurella Fabricius, 1775; Pyralis myllerella Fabricius, 1794; Tinea myllerella; Tinea zinckeella Hübner, 1810-13; Cosmopteryx hierochloae Stainton, 1870; Cosmopteryx orichalciella Morris, 1870; Tinea hermannella Fabricius, 1781

= Chrysoesthia drurella =

Species of moth

Chrysoesthia drurella is a moth from the family Gelechiidae. It is found in most of Europe, Russia and North America.

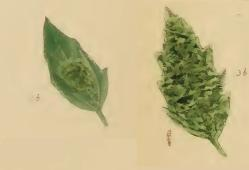
Mined leaves of Chenopodium (3b, 3b*)

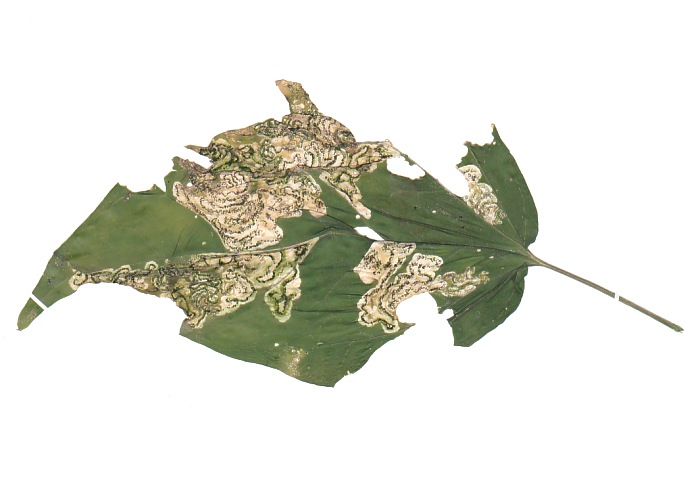
Mined leaf

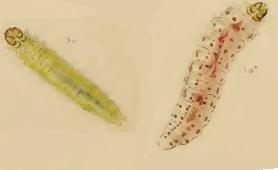
Young larva (3a), adult larva (3a*)

The wingspan is 7–9 mm.

The host plants are Chenopodium and Atriplex species. Chrysoesthia drurella can mainly be found in agricultural areas. The moth has two generations in one year. The first in May and June and the second in August and September.
