= Chrysoesthia aletris =

Scientific classification
- Domain: Eukaryota
- Kingdom: Animalia
- Phylum: Arthropoda
- Class: Insecta
- Order: Lepidoptera
- Family: Gelechiidae
- Genus: Chrysoesthia
- Species: C. aletris

Binomial name
- Chrysoesthia aletris (Walsingham, 1919)

Synonyms
- Aristotelia aletris Walsingham, 1919

Species of moth

Chrysoesthia aletris is a moth of the family Gelechiidae. It is found on Sicily.

The wingspan is about 6.5 mm. The forewings are mealy whitish, dusted with fuscous, except on a terminal band on the costa. The hindwings are shining steel grey.
