= Chrysoesthia falkovitshi =

Scientific classification
- Kingdom: Animalia
- Phylum: Arthropoda
- Clade: Pancrustacea
- Class: Insecta
- Order: Lepidoptera
- Family: Gelechiidae
- Genus: Chrysoesthia
- Species: C. falkovitshi

Binomial name
- Chrysoesthia falkovitshi Lvovsky & Piskunov, 1989

Species of moth

Chrysoesthia falkovitshi is a moth of the family Gelechiidae. It is found in Ukraine, Russia (southern Ural, Lower Volga) and Mongolia. The habitat consists of calcareous Artemisia steppes.
