= Chrysoesthia longifibriata =

Scientific classification
- Domain: Eukaryota
- Kingdom: Animalia
- Phylum: Arthropoda
- Class: Insecta
- Order: Lepidoptera
- Family: Gelechiidae
- Genus: Chrysoesthia
- Species: C. longifibriata

Binomial name
- Chrysoesthia longifibriata M.M. Omelko & N.V. Omelko, 2010

Species of moth

Chrysoesthia longifibriata is a moth of the family Gelechiidae. It is found in the Russian Far East, where it has been recorded from the southern part of Primorsky Krai.
