= Chrysoesthia compositella =

Scientific classification
- Domain: Eukaryota
- Kingdom: Animalia
- Phylum: Arthropoda
- Class: Insecta
- Order: Lepidoptera
- Family: Gelechiidae
- Genus: Chrysoesthia
- Species: C. compositella

Binomial name
- Chrysoesthia compositella (Chrétien, 1915)

Synonyms
- Guebla compositella Chrétien, 1915

Species of moth

Chrysoesthia compositella is a moth of the family Gelechiidae. It is found in Algeria.

The wingspan is 13–16 mm. The forewings are whitish, with brownish-black and ochreous-yellow scales. The hindwings are whitish.
