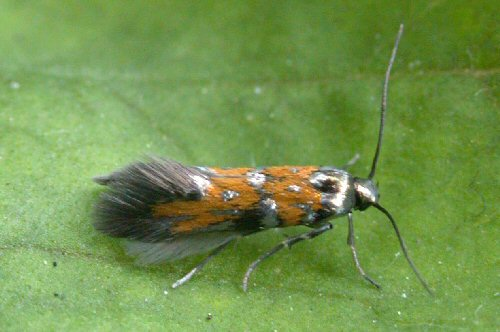
- Chrysoesthia drurella

Scientific classification
- Kingdom: Animalia
- Phylum: Arthropoda
- Clade: Pancrustacea
- Class: Insecta
- Order: Lepidoptera
- Family: Gelechiidae
- Tribe: Apatetrini
- Genus: Chrysoesthia; Hübner, 1825

Synonyms
- Anaphaula Walsingham, 1904; Guebla Chrétien, 1915; Microsetia Stephens, 1829; Chrysesthia Agassiz, 1847; Chrysia Bruand, 1850; Nomia Clemens, 1860 (preocc. Latreille, 1804); Chrysopora Clemens, 1860; Nannodia Heinemann, 1870

= Chrysoesthia =

Genus of moths

Chrysoesthia is a genus of moths in the family Gelechiidae.

== Species ==
- Chrysoesthia aletris (Walsingham, 1919)
- Chrysoesthia atriplicella (Amsel, 1939)
- Chrysoesthia boseae (Walsingham, 1908)
- Chrysoesthia candidella (Chrétien, 1915)
- Chrysoesthia compositella (Chrétien, 1915)
- Chrysoesthia drurella (Fabricius, 1775)
- Chrysoesthia eppelsheimi (Staudinger, 1885)
- Chrysoesthia falkovitshi Lvovsky & Piskunov, 1989
- Chrysoesthia gaditella (Staudinger, 1859)
- Chrysoesthia halymella Amsel & Hering, 1931
- Chrysoesthia heringi (Kuroko, 1961)
- Chrysoesthia isocharis (Vári, 1963)
- Chrysoesthia lingulacella (Clemens, 1860)
- Chrysoesthia longifibriata M.M. Omelko & N.V. Omelko, 2010
- Chrysoesthia luteola M.M. Omelko & N.V. Omelko, 2010
- Chrysoesthia mimetis (Vári, 1963)
- Chrysoesthia parilis (Vári, 1963)
- Chrysoesthia sexguttella (Thunberg, 1794)
- Chrysoesthia stipelloides (Janse, 1950)
- Chrysoesthia verrucosa Tokár, 1999
- Chrysoesthia versicolorella (Kearfott, 1908)
