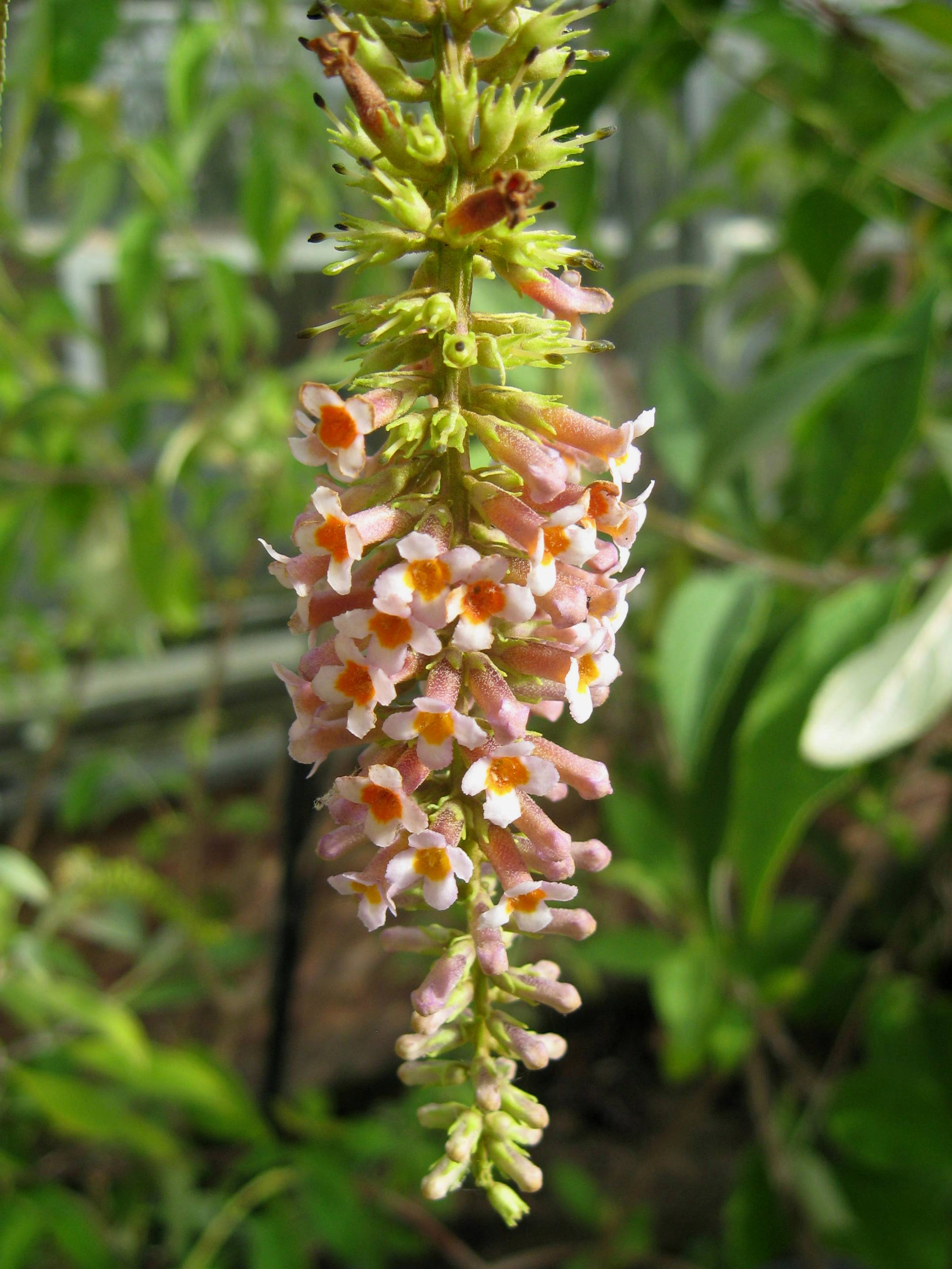
- Buddleja macrostachya inflorescence

Scientific classification
- Kingdom: Plantae
- Clade: Tracheophytes
- Clade: Angiosperms
- Clade: Eudicots
- Clade: Asterids
- Order: Lamiales
- Family: Scrophulariaceae
- Genus: Buddleja
- Species: B. macrostachya

Binomial name
- Buddleja macrostachya Wallich ex Benth.

Synonyms
- Buddleja cylindrostachya Kraenzlin; Buddleja hancockii Kraenzlin; Buddleja henryi Rehd. & E. H. Wilson var. hancockii (Kraenzlin) C. Marquand; Buddleja hookeri C. Marquand; Buddleja hosseusiana Kraenzlin; Buddleja martii Schmidt

= Buddleja macrostachya =

Species of plant

Buddleja macrostachya is a large deciduous shrub or small tree with a vast distribution, from Xizang (Tibet) through western China, Bhutan, Sikkim, northern India, Bangladesh, Myanmar (Burma), to Thailand and Vietnam, growing in scrub on mountain slopes to an altitude of 3,200 m, and along rivers in forests. The species was named and described by Wallich ex Bentham in 1835.

Leeuwenberg sank several species (see Synonyms) as macrostachya owing to the similarity of the individual flowers, whilst acknowledging that the structure of the inflorescences varied, from continuous (e.g. B. cylindrostachya) to interrupted (e.g. B. hookeri); he also considered macrostachya very closely allied to B. forrestii.

== Description ==
Buddleja macrostachya grows 1–6 m in height, flowering from March to September in the wild. The branchlets are quadrangular, and winged, stellate tomentose when young. The leaves are sessile or subsessile, narrowly to very narrowly elliptic, and hugely variable in size, ranging from 4–45 cm long by 1–15 cm wide, mostly stellate tomentose, the margins crenate-serrate, and the apex acuminate. The pendent terminal inflorescences comprise dense cylindrical panicles 5–20 cm long by 2.5–4 cm wide, the corollas purple, mauve, lilac or pale pink, with orange to red throats. 2n = 114.

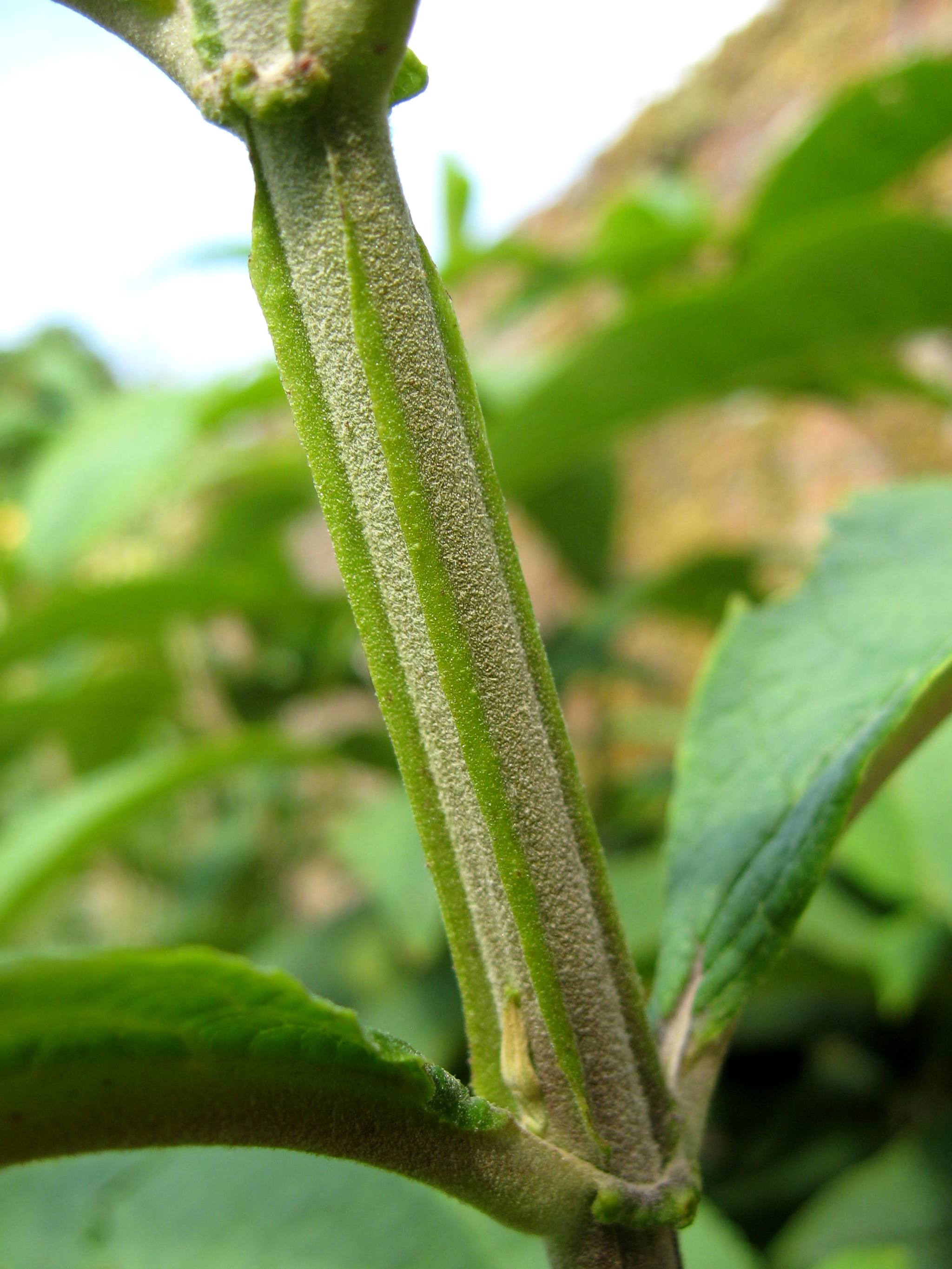
Winged Stem

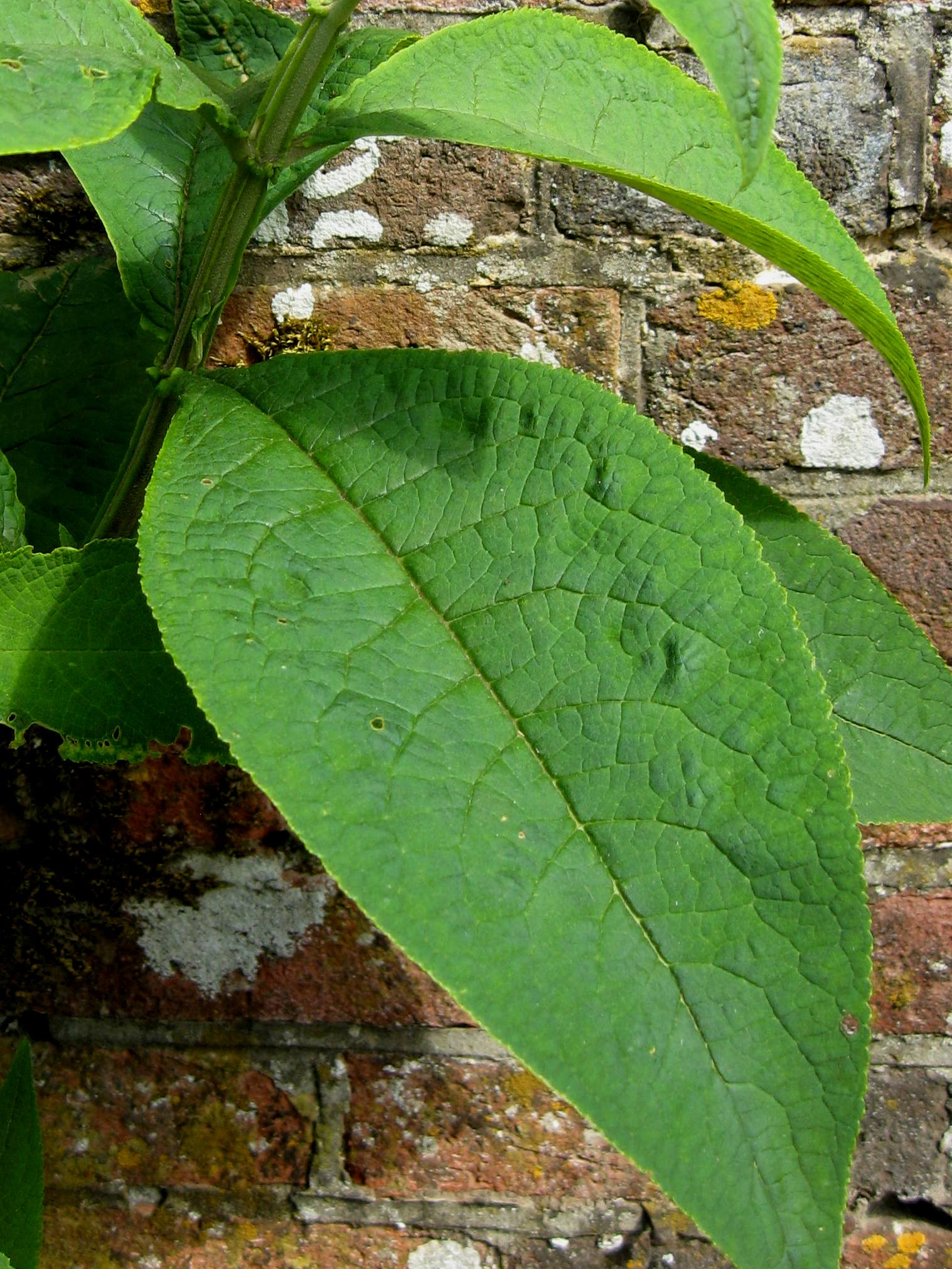
Leaf

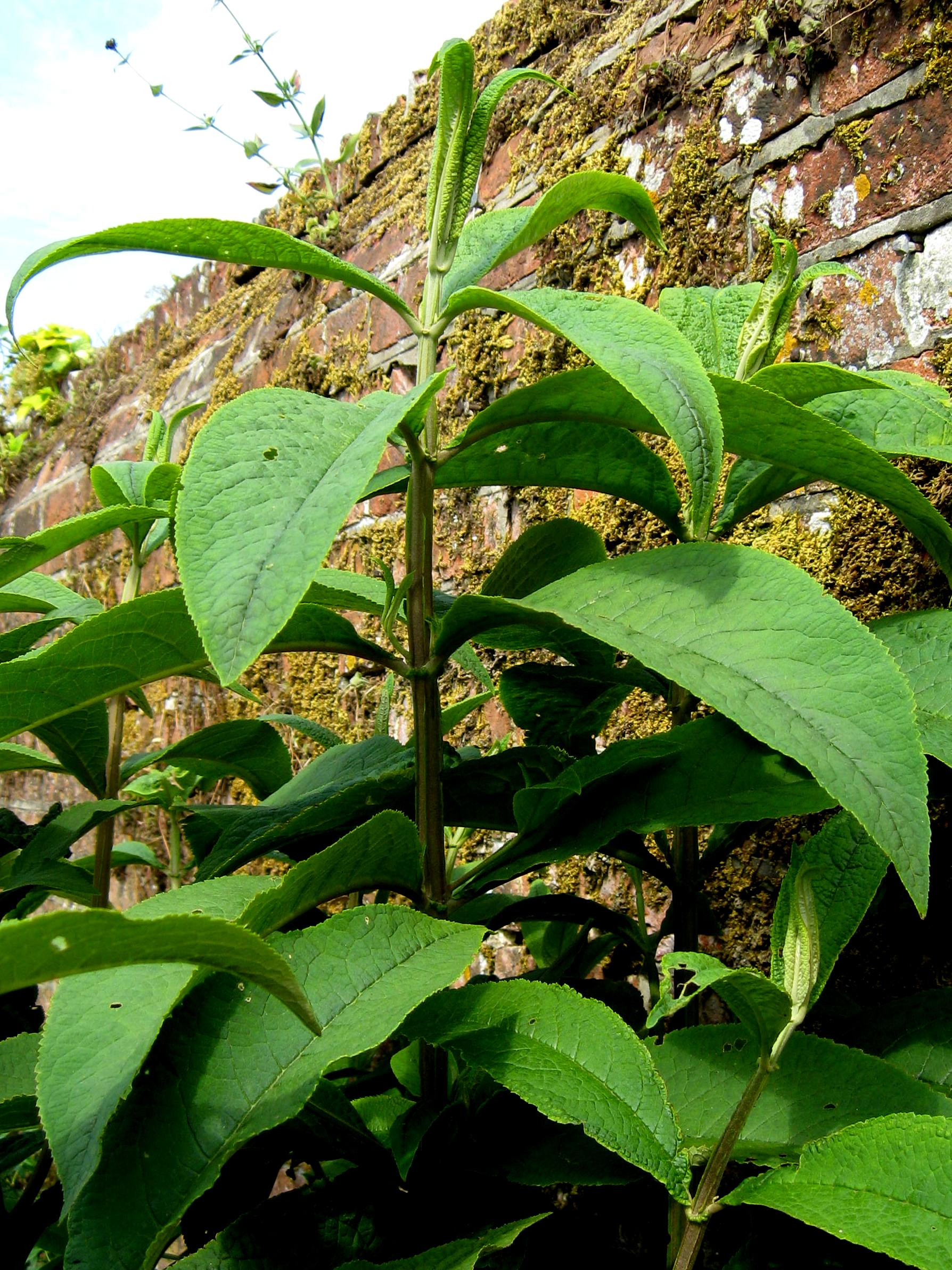
Foliage

== Cultivation ==
Buddleja macrostachya is not entirely frost hardy, and remains rare in cultivation. It is best planted against a south-facing wall in the UK; however, two specimens are known to have grown with such vigour as to necessitate felling to prevent structural damage. Several small potted plants feature in the NCCPG collection of Buddleja held by the Longstock Park Nursery, near Stockbridge. Hardiness: USDA zones 9–10.
