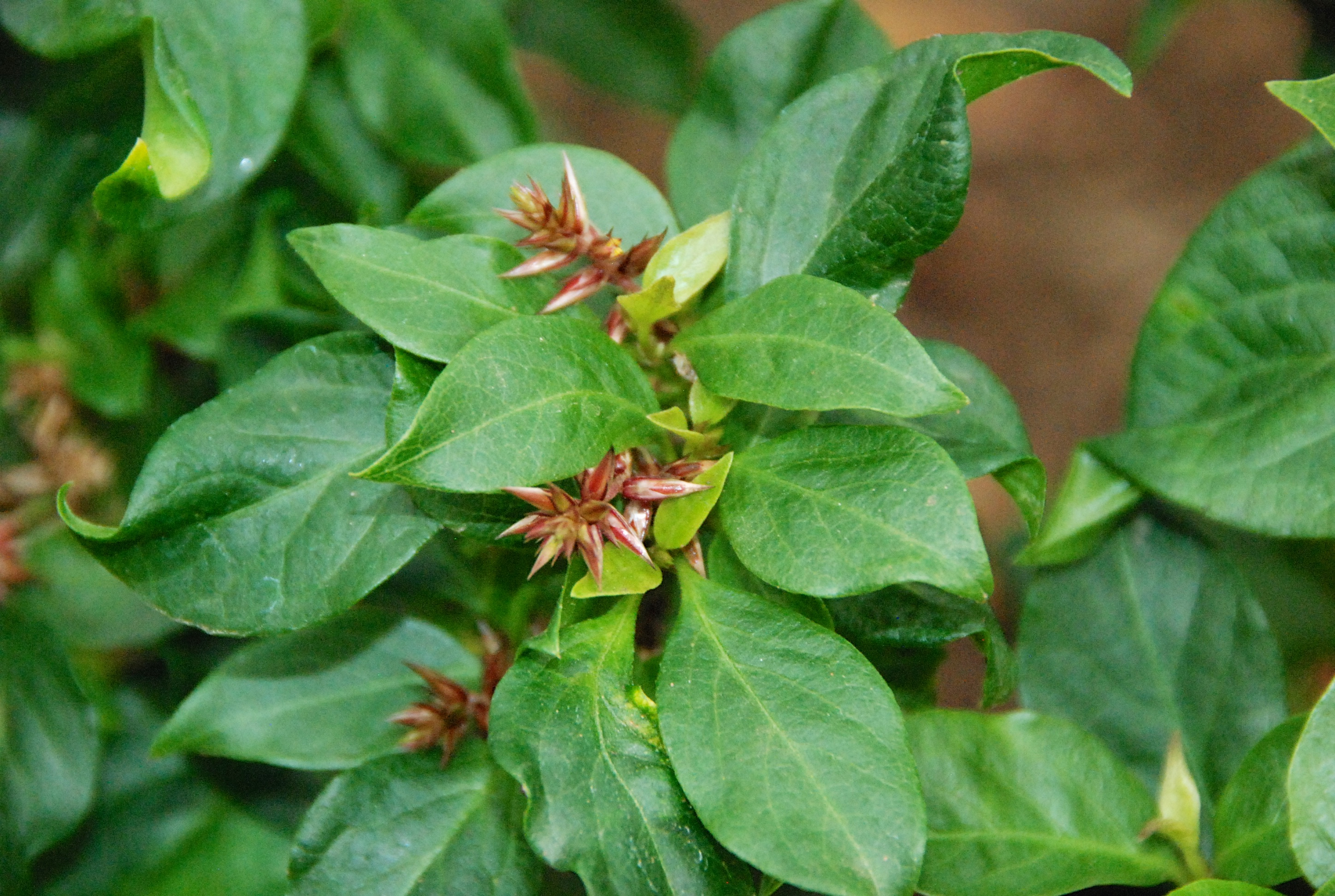

Conservation status
- Critically endangered (EPBC Act)

Scientific classification
- Kingdom: Plantae
- Clade: Tracheophytes
- Clade: Angiosperms
- Clade: Eudicots
- Order: Caryophyllales
- Family: Amaranthaceae
- Genus: Achyranthes
- Species: A. arborescens

Binomial name
- Achyranthes arborescens R.Br.

Synonyms
- Centrostachys arborescens (R.Br.) Standl.

= Achyranthes arborescens =

Species of flowering plant

Achyranthes arborescens (common names - Chaff tree, Soft-wood) is a plant in the Amaranthaceae family endemic to Norfolk Island. It is a critically endangered species under the Australian Federal government's Environment Protection and Biodiversity Conservation Act.

== Description ==
A. arborescens is a soft-wooded tree growing up to a height of 9 m. Its leaves are on slender stalks which are 5–15 mm long and have hairs lying close to them (appressed hairs). The leaf blades are elliptic to slightly oblanceolate, and from 50 to 80 mm long (sometimes 30–100 mm long) by 20–35 mm broad (with the juvenile foliage being larger). The base of the blade is acute and attenuates to the stalk. The leaf margins have irregular and very shallowly rounded teeth, and are yellow-green or dark green above, and light green below. The margins are very minutely fringed, and there are appressed hairs on the midrib beneath. The inflorescence is a spike and is terminal on the side branches. It has a covering of long soft weak hairs which are clearly separated but not sparse and is 2–4 cm long. The inflorescence stalk is 1–2 cm long. There are four brownish red tepals (7–9 mm by 1.8–2.1 mm), and four stamens. The anther filaments are 0.7–1.5 mm long. There are 20-90 white or pale yellow flowers in an inflorescence. The perianth is a pale amber and the flowers are enclosed by shining pink, sharp-pointed bracts. The fruit is enclosed in a bladder-like sac which does not open at maturity to release the seed. It is cylindrical and 2–2.5 mm by 1–1.5 mm.

It flowers and fruits from November to March.

== Habitat ==
It appears to prefer growing by streams and in damp forests.

== Taxonomy and naming ==
It was first described by Robert Brown in 1810, and he gave it the specific epithet, arborescens, from the Latin, arborescens, "becoming a tree" or "tree-like".

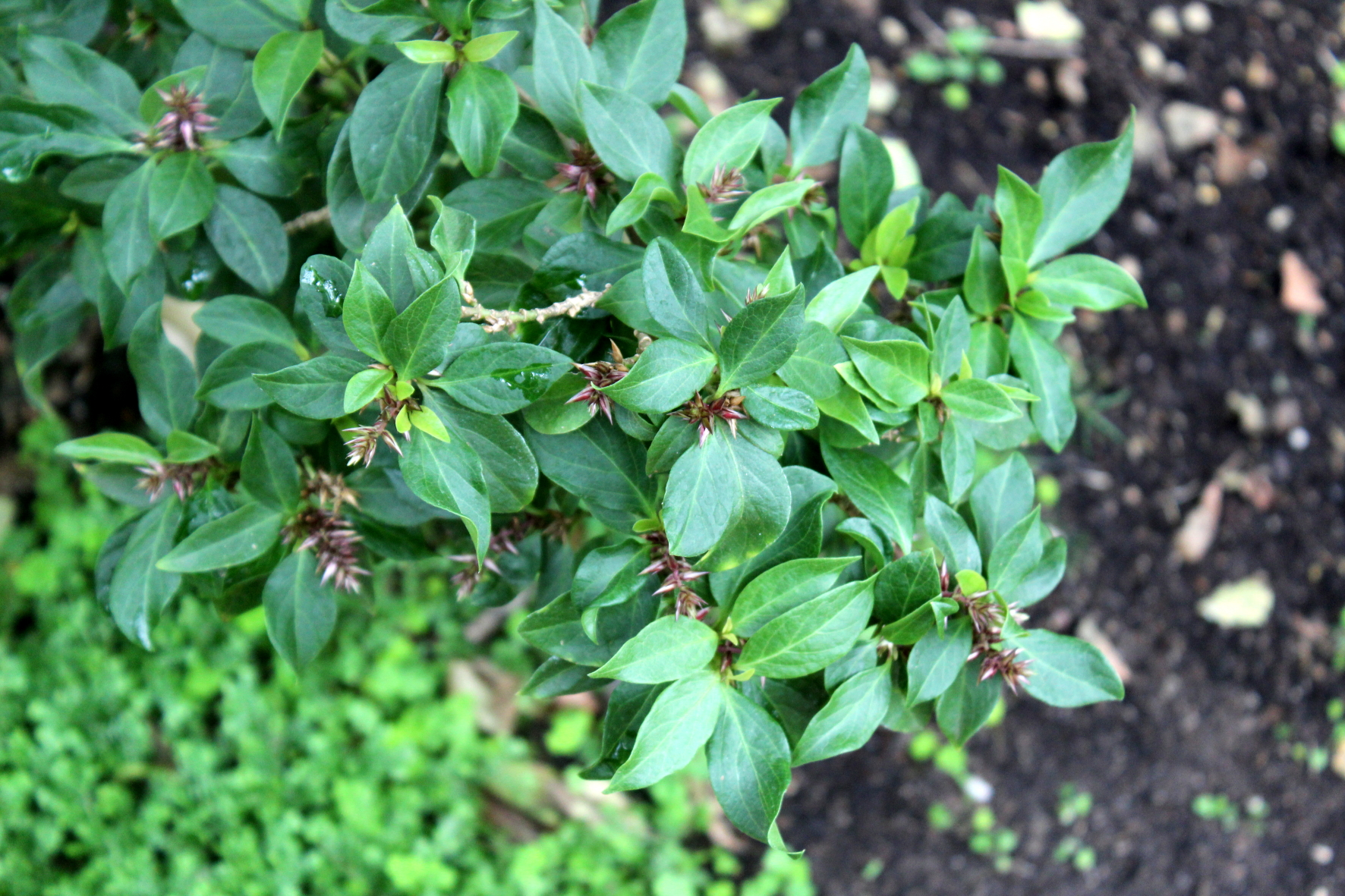

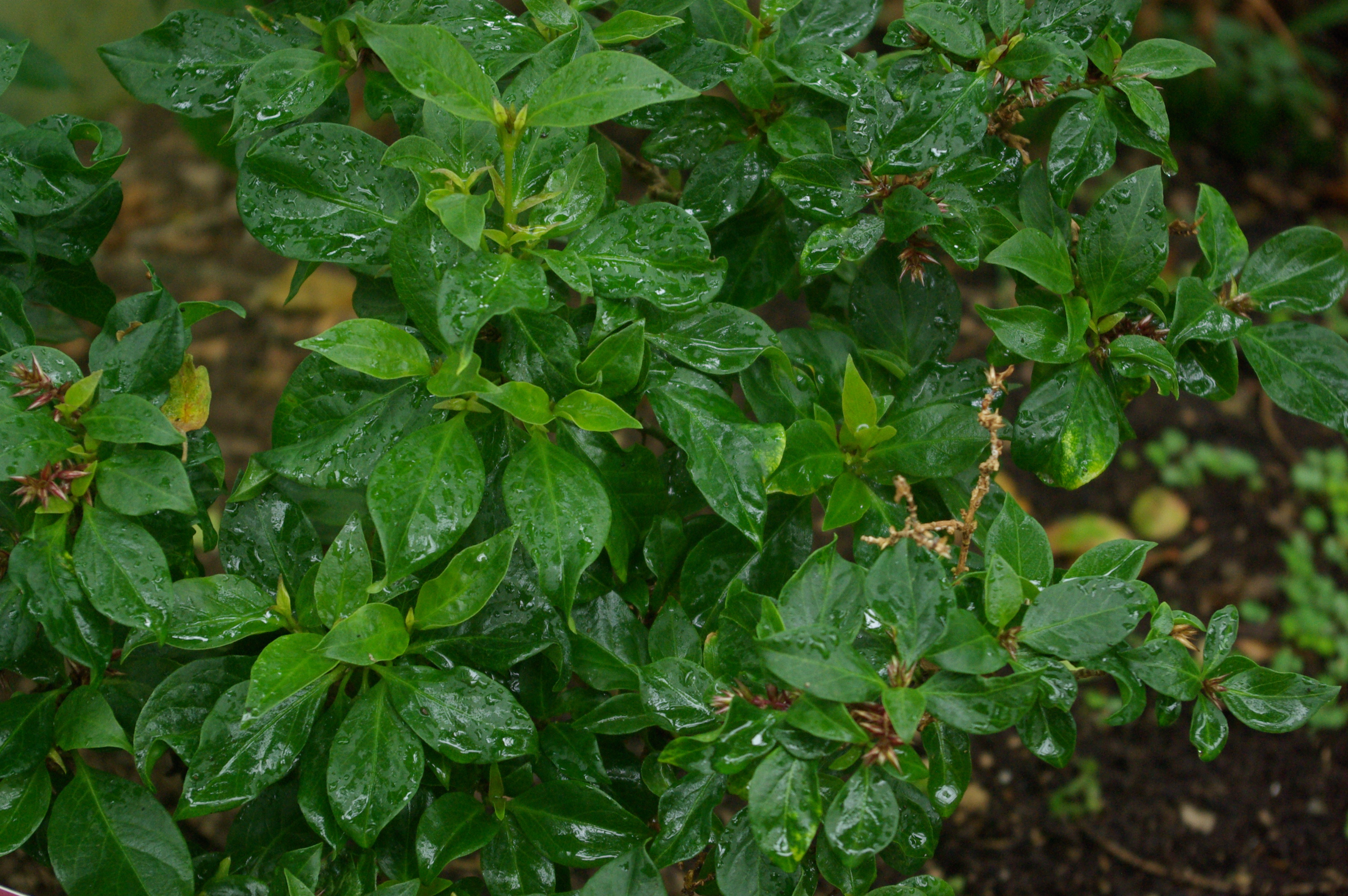

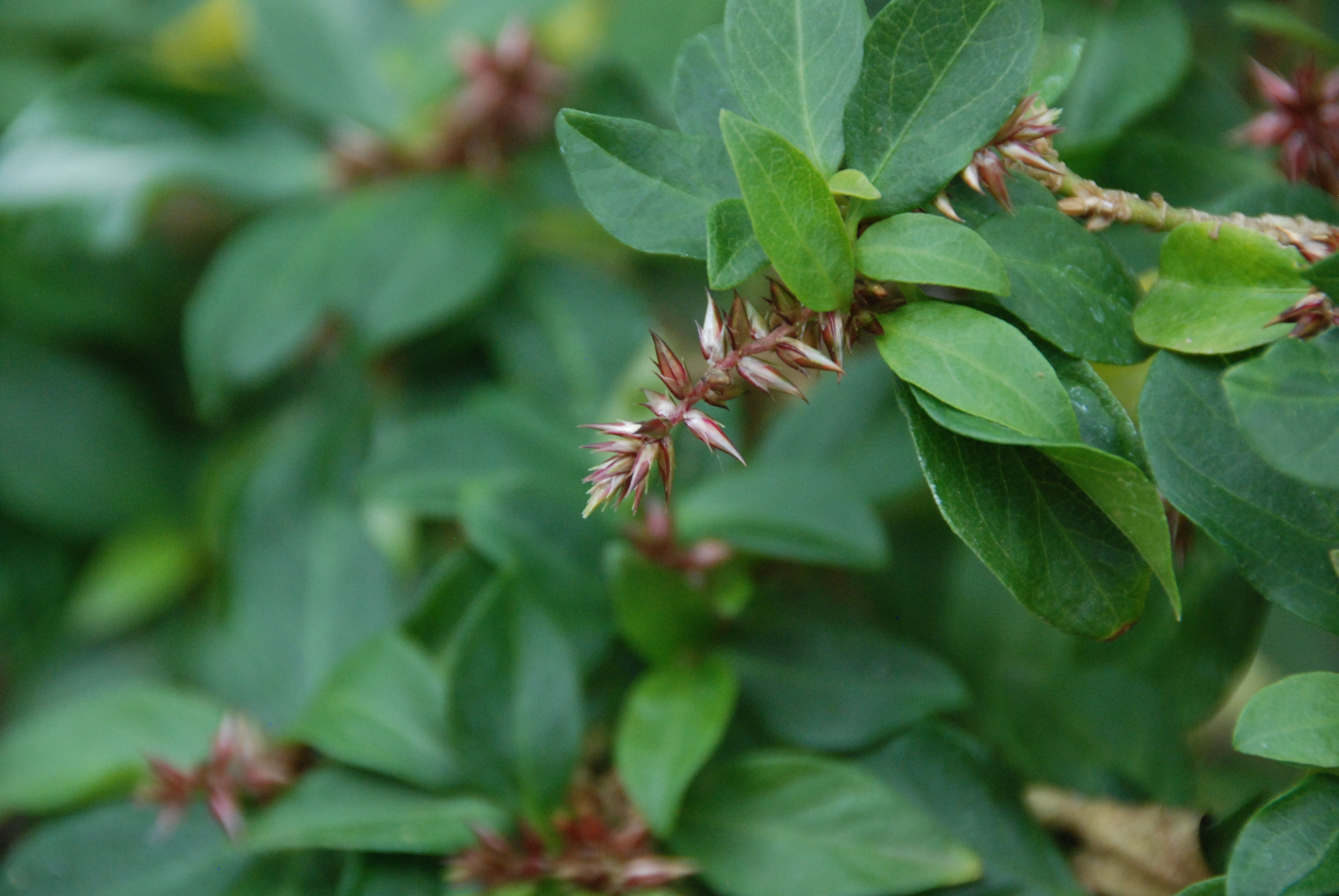

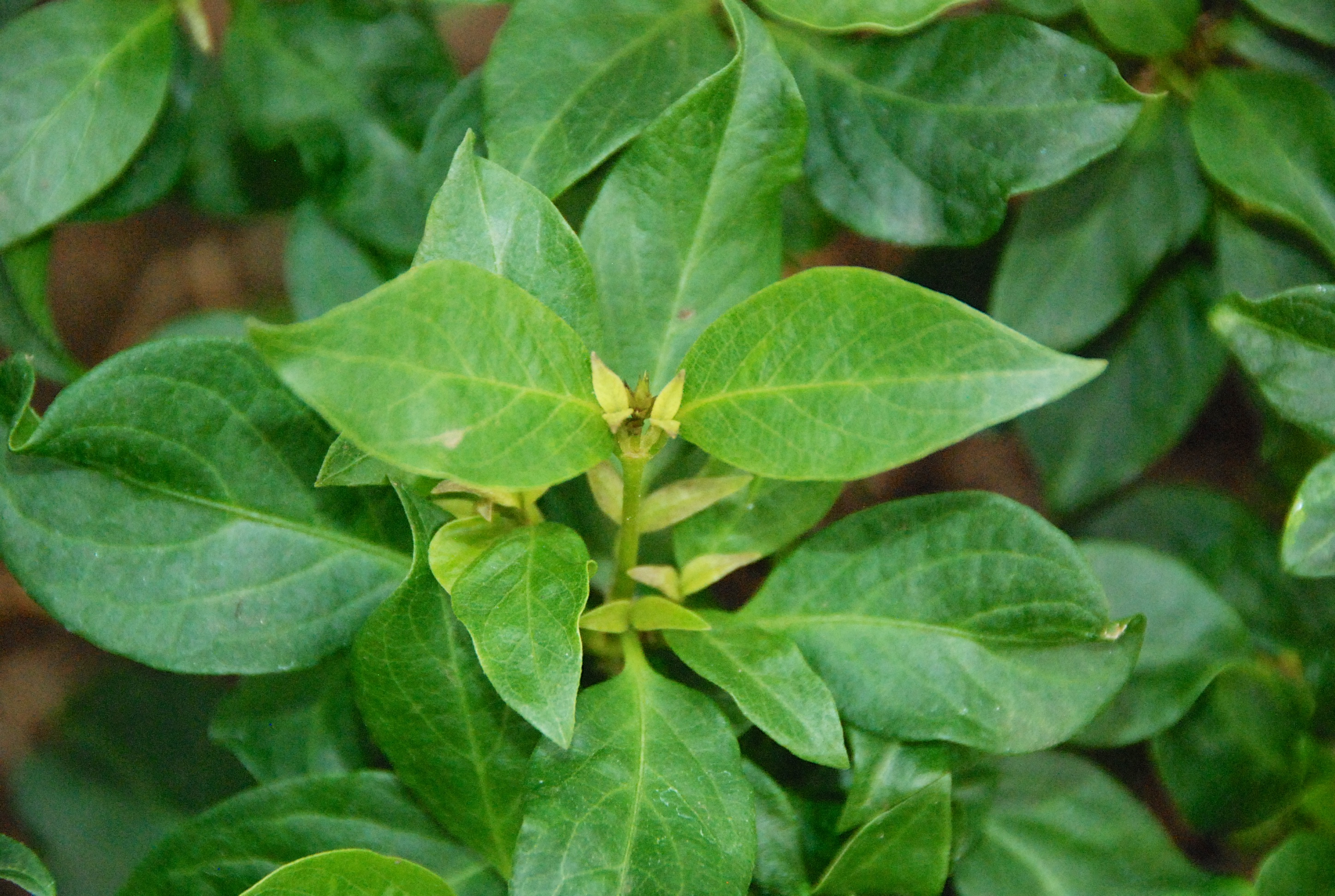

== Conservation status ==
A. arborescens has been declared "critically endangered" under the EPBC Act. Despite setting copious seed, seedling recruitment is reduced by cattle grazing, by high levels of seed predation from the introduced rat population, and by introduced weeds such as Solanum mauritianum and Homalanthus populifolius which require a similar habitat to A. arborescens and possibly may out-compete it. Additionally the introduced vine Ipomoea cairica sometimes smothers the trees. Tourism also negatively impacts this tiny population.
