= Marselein Rusario Almeida =

Indian botanist (1939-2017)

- Born: 1939
- Died: 2017 (aged 77–78)
- Scientific career
- Fields: Botany
- Author abbrev. (botany): M.R.Almeida

Marselein Rusario Almeida (1939–2017) was an Indian botanist.
