= Silene flavescens =

Scientific classification
- Kingdom: Plantae
- Clade: Embryophytes
- Clade: Tracheophytes
- Clade: Spermatophytes
- Clade: Angiosperms
- Clade: Eudicots
- Order: Caryophyllales
- Family: Caryophyllaceae
- Genus: Silene
- Species: S. flavescens

Binomial name
- Silene flavescens Waldst. & Kit. (1804)

Subspecies
- 4; see text

Species of flowering plant

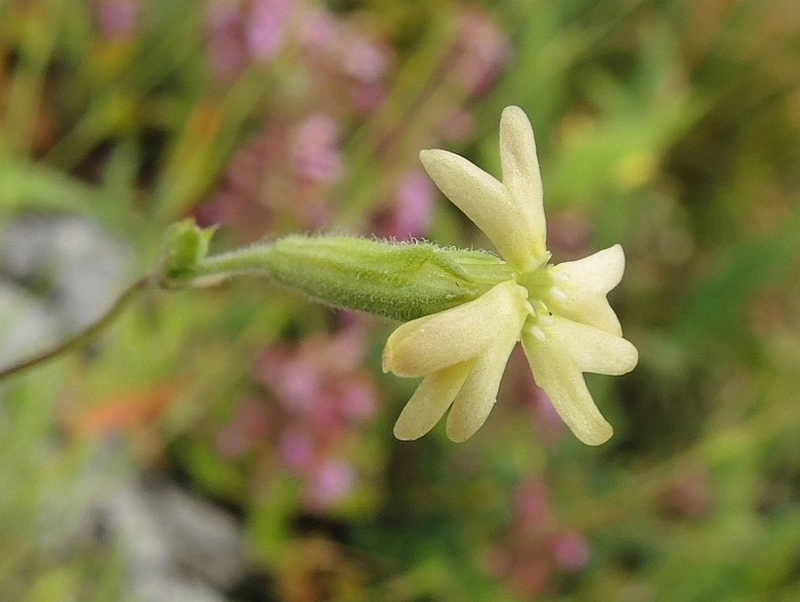
Silene flavescens stub flower leaf arrangement. Palmately compound leaf.

Silene flavescens is a species of flowering plant part of the genus Silene, family Caryophyllaceae. It is native to the Balkan Peninsula and Hungary. It is an herbaceous species belonging to the tribe Sileneae.

== Description ==
They can be found in the serpentine areas of the Rhodope Mountains. They are native to Mt Orvilos on the southern Green flank of the mountain. It also appears on the Bulgarian side of Mt Slavjanka. The stub has been collected in northern most Greece since 1977. Their flowering period is from mid-April to early May. Petal limb ranges from 3 to 6 millimeters. The length of the anthophore is between 1 and 2 millimeters. The plant lacks glandular hairs and the stamens are included. Like other members of the genus Silene, Silene flavescens is expected to produce phytoecdysteroids and triterpene saponins as a way to protect itself from pathogens and plant eating predators.

== Subspecies ==
Four species are accepted.

- Silene flavescens subsp. dictaea (Rech.f.) Greuter – eastern Crete
- Silene flavescens subsp. flavescens – Balkan Peninsula and Hungary
- Silene flavescens subsp. stojanovii (Panov) Delip. – Bulgaria
- Silene flavescens subsp. thessalonica (Boiss. & Heldr.) Nyman – Albania, Bulgaria, mainland Greece, and the East Aegean Islands.

== Life cycle ==
Mitochondrial and chloroplast genomes are inherited maternally.

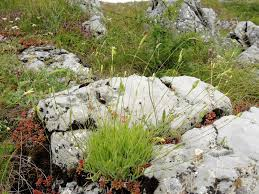
Terrain of Silene flavescens stub that is mountainous and rocky

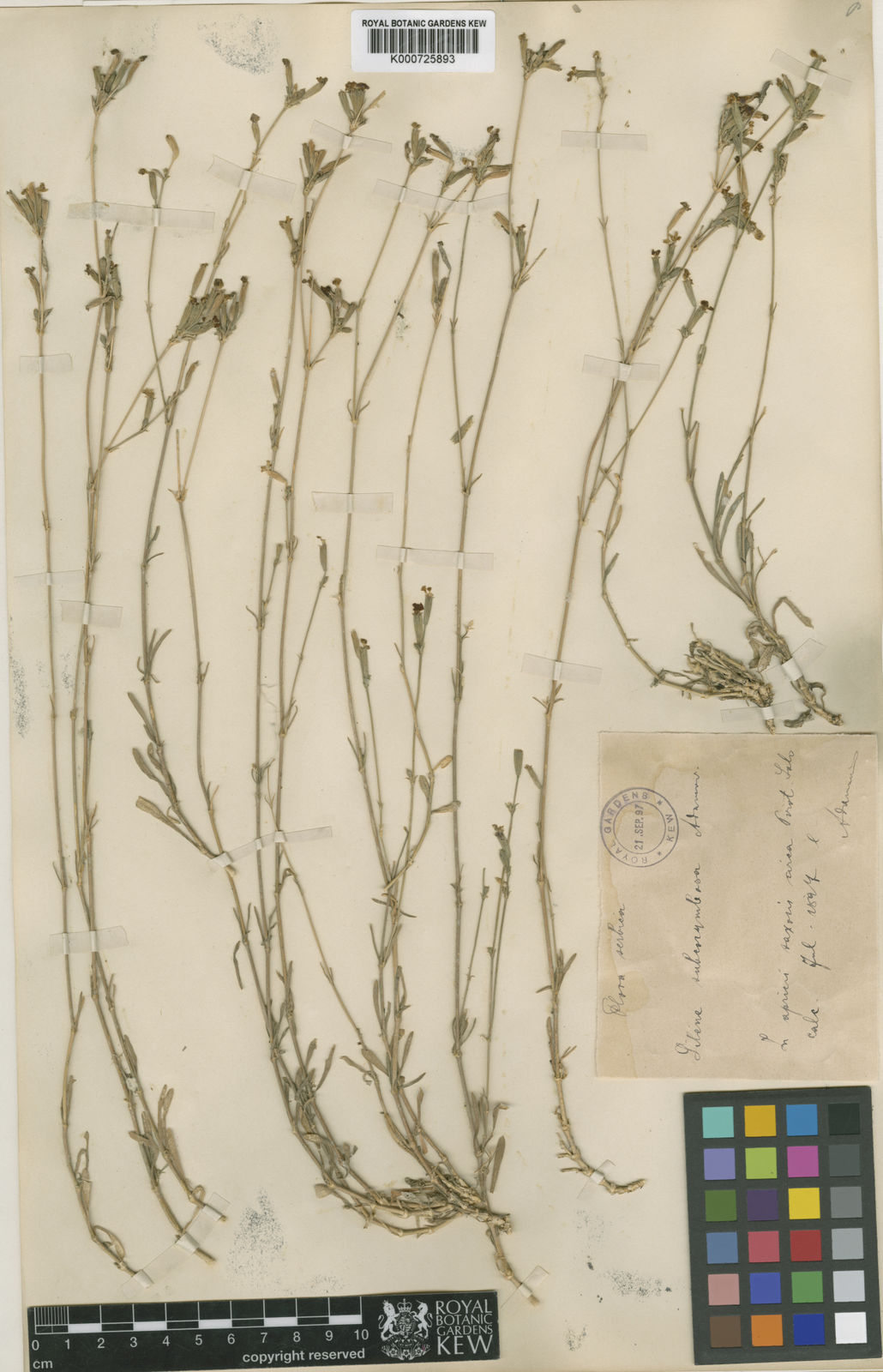
Leaves follow an alternate leaf pattern. A single leaf rising from node.
