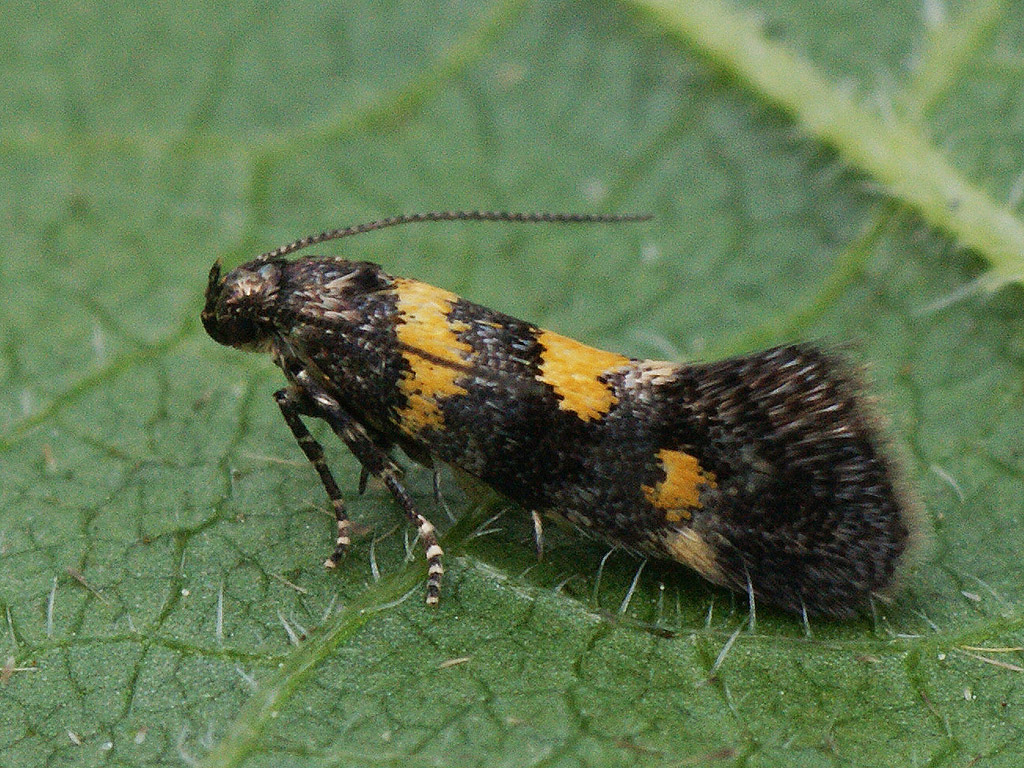

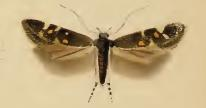

Scientific classification
- Domain: Eukaryota
- Kingdom: Animalia
- Phylum: Arthropoda
- Class: Insecta
- Order: Lepidoptera
- Family: Gelechiidae
- Genus: Chrysoesthia
- Species: C. sexguttella

Binomial name
- Chrysoesthia sexguttella (Thunberg, 1794)

Synonyms
- Microsetia sexguttella Thunberg, 1794; Tinea sexguttella; Lita naeviferella Duponchel, 1843; Chrysopora naeviferella; Microsetia aurofasciella Stephens, 1834; Tinea stipella Hübner, 1796; Gelechia stipella var. stipivicinella Bruand, 1859

= Chrysoesthia sexguttella =

Species of moth

Chrysoesthia sexguttella, the orache leafminer moth, is a moth in the family Gelechiidae. It is found in all of Europe, east to southern Siberia, as well as the north-eastern parts of North America, where it might be an introduced species.

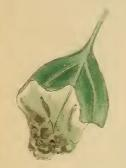
Mined Atriplex leaf

The wingspan is 8–10 mm. The head is metallic brassy-grey. Forewings are dark purplish-grey, mixed with black, with some whitish scales; a yellow subdorsal spot in the middle, and a smaller one in disc posteriorly; an ill-defined ochreous-white tornal spot, and another on costa at 3/4. Hindwings are grey. The larva is yellow-whitish; dorsal line brownish; lateral line of orange -reddish spots; head pale brown; plate of 2 blackish.

Adults are on the wing from May to June, and again from August to September. There are two generations per year.

The larvae mine the leaves of Atriplex species (including Atriplex cakotheca, Atriplex hastata, Atriplex hortensis, Atriplex littoralis, Atriplex prostrata, Atriplex nitens, Atriplex patula and Atriplex sibirica), Chenopodium species (including Chenopodium album, Chenopodium bonus-henricus, Chenopodium giganteum, Chenopodium glaucum, Chenopodium hybridum, Chenopodium murale, Chenopodium opulifolium, Chenopodium polyspermum, Chenopodium quinoa, Chenopodium urbicum and Chenopodium vulvaria), Amaranthus blitum, Amaranthus caudatus, Bassia scoparia and Spinacia. They form a contorted gallery on the surface of the leaves.

== Parasitoids ==
Pnigalio gyamiensis is a larval-pupal ectoparasitoid of Chrysoesthia sexguttella. The female of P. gyamiensis lays a single egg on the skin of the host larva or nearby it, without any significant preference for a particular variant. The presence of long hairs on its body provides the newly hatched first larval instar with high mobility.

== Life cycle ==
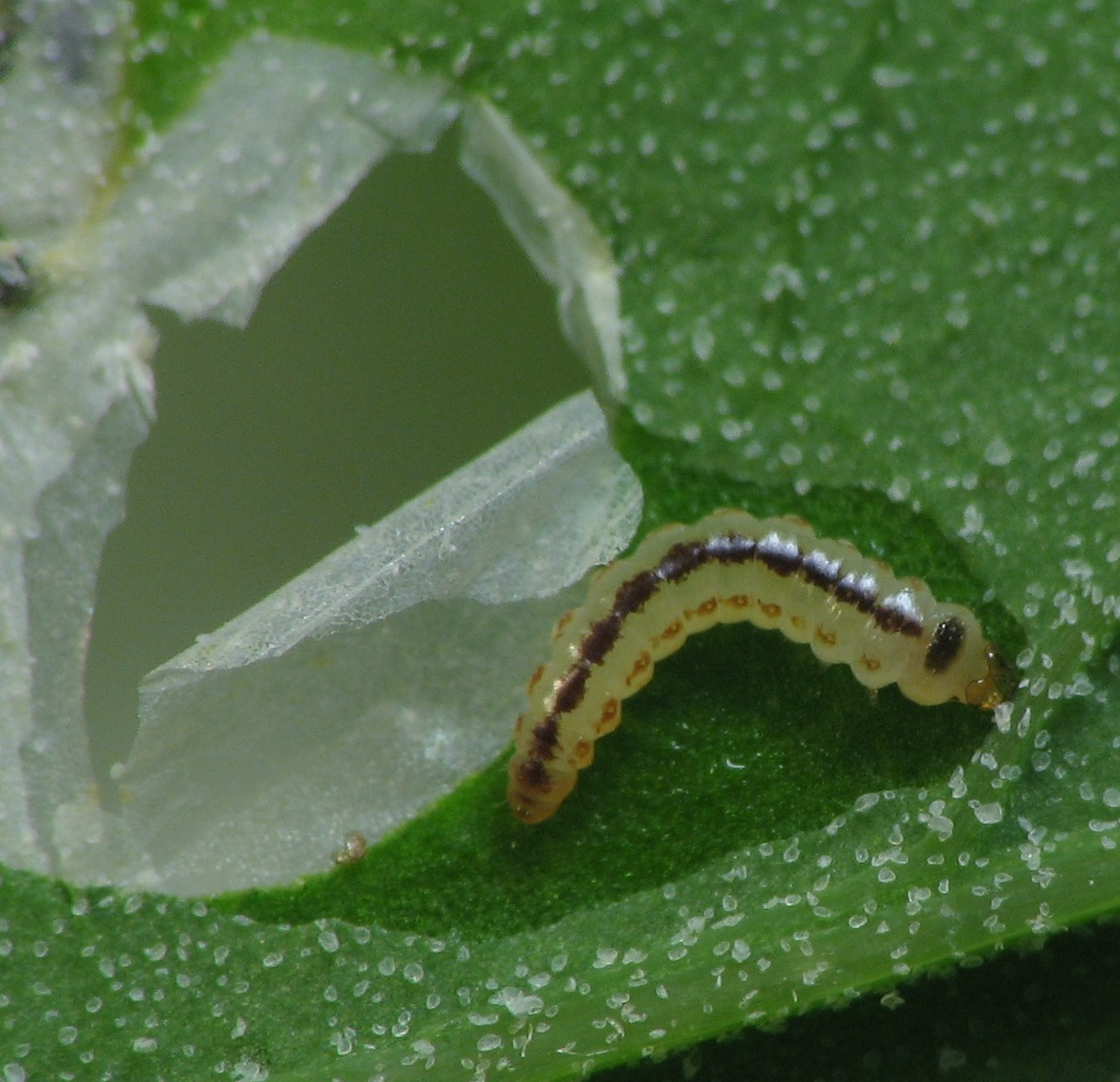
Larva

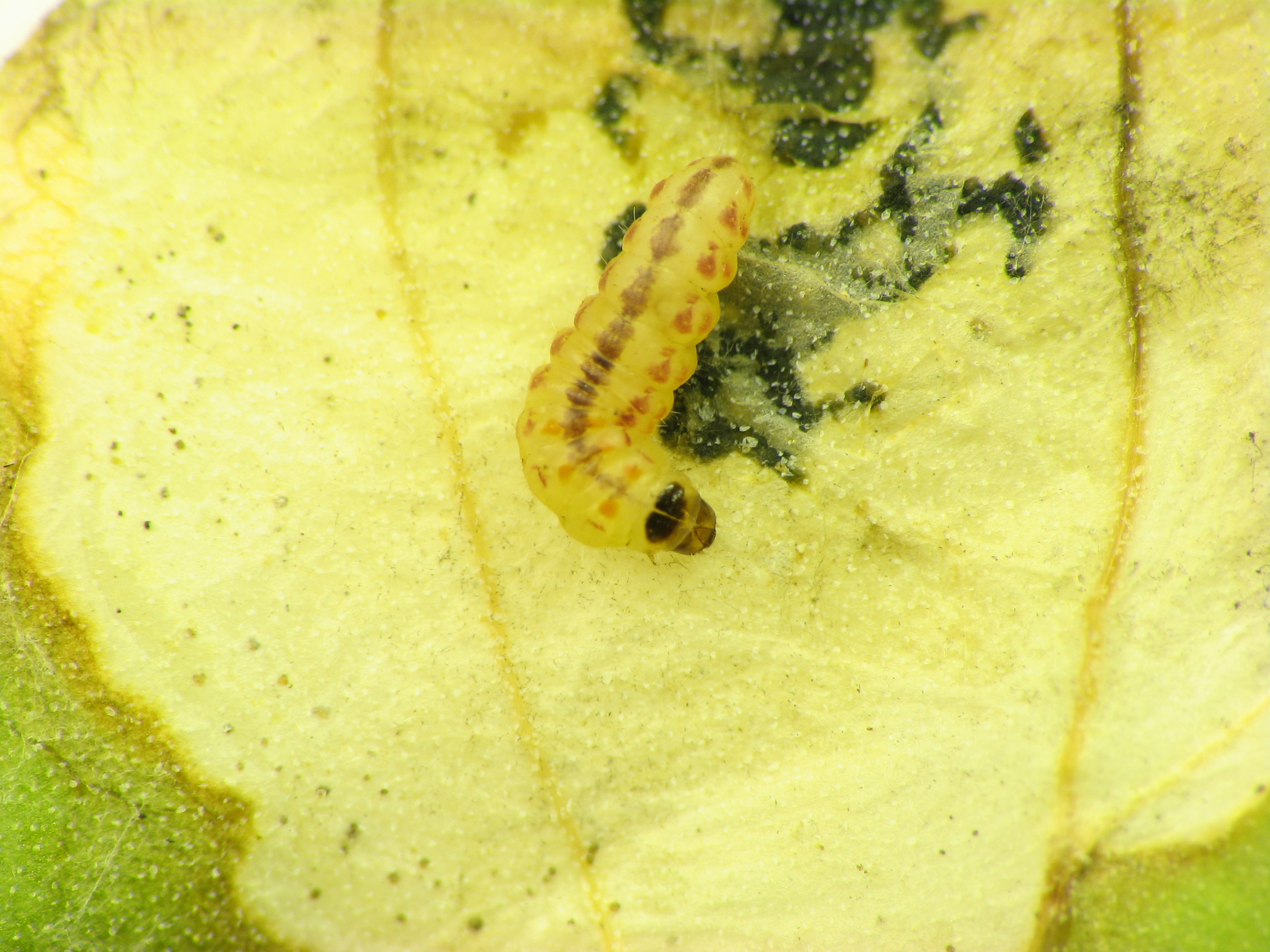
Older larva

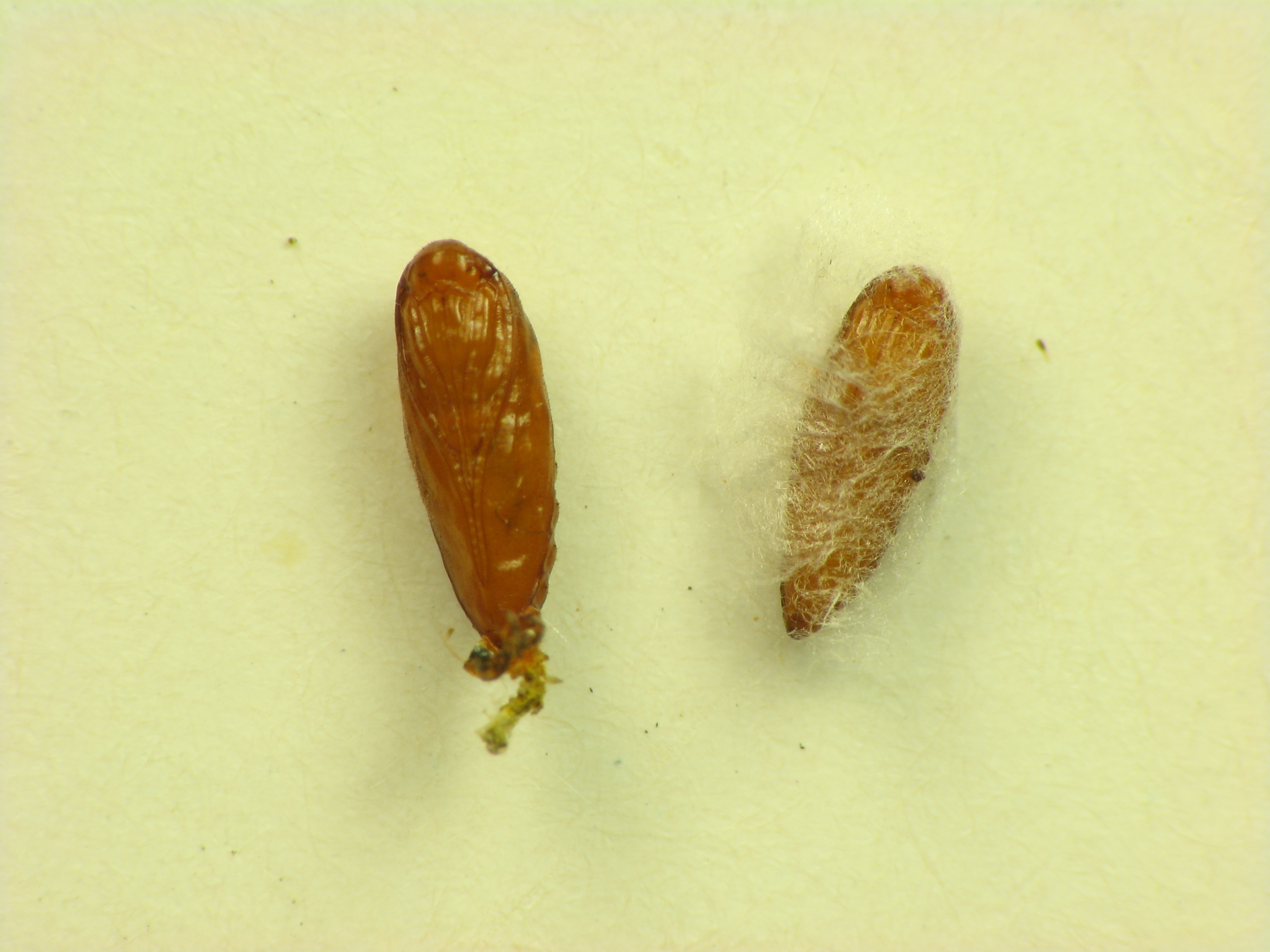
Pupa with and without cocoon
