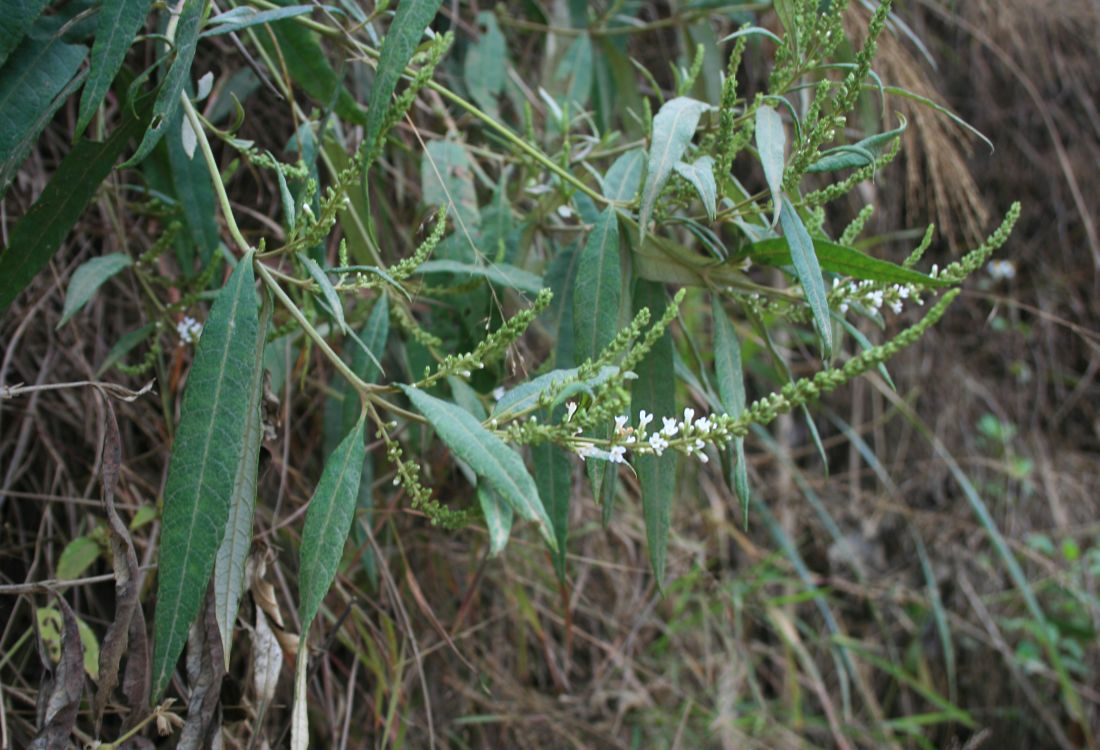
- Buddleja asiatica

Conservation status
- Least Concern (IUCN 3.1)

Scientific classification
- Kingdom: Plantae
- Clade: Tracheophytes
- Clade: Angiosperms
- Clade: Eudicots
- Clade: Asterids
- Order: Lamiales
- Family: Scrophulariaceae
- Genus: Buddleja
- Species: B. asiatica

Binomial name
- Buddleja asiatica Lour.

Synonyms
- Heterotypic synonyms: Vitex esquirolii H.Lév.; Buddleja acuminatissima Blume; Buddleja amentacea Kraenzl.; Buddleja arfakensis Kaneh. & Hatus.; Buddleja asiatica var. brevicuspa Koord.; Buddleja asiatica var. densiflora (Blume) Koord. & Valeton; Buddleja asiatica var. salicina (Lam.) Koord. & Valeton; Buddleja asiatica var. sundaica (Blume) Koord. & Valeton; Buddleja densiflora Blume; Buddleja discolor Roth; Buddleja neemda Buch.-Ham. ex Roxb.; Buddleja neemda var. philippensis Cham. & Schltdl.; Buddleja salicina Lam.; Buddleja serrulata Roth; Buddleja subserrata Buch.-Ham. ex D.Don; Buddleja sundaica Blume; Buddleja virgata Blanco

= Buddleja asiatica =

Species of flowering plant

Buddleja asiatica, also known as dogtail, is a species of flowering plant in the figwort family, Scrophulariaceae. It grows in open woodland at elevations < 2,800 m either as understorey scrub, or as a small tree. First described by Loureiro in 1790, B. asiatica was introduced to the UK in 1874, and accorded the RHS Award of Garden Merit (record 675) in 1993. It is highly invasive in Hawaii, Guam, and the Northern Mariana Islands.

== Description ==
Buddleja asiatica can grow < 7 m tall in the wild. The leaves are usually narrowly lanceolate to ovoid, < 30 cm long, attached by petioles 15 mm long, to branches round in section. The sweetly scented flowers are usually white, occasionally pale violet, and borne in late winter at the ends of the long, lax branches in slender panicles, the size of which can vary widely according to source. Ploidy: 2n = 38 (diploid).

== Distribution ==
This somewhat tender deciduous shrub is native to Assam, Bangladesh, Borneo, Cambodia, China (North-Central, South-Central and Southeast), East and West Himalaya, Hainan, India, Java, Laos, the Lesser Sunda Islands, Malaysia, the Maluku Islands, the Mariana Islands, Myanmar, Nepal, New Guinea, Pakistan, the Philippines, Sulawesi, Sumatra, Taiwan, Thailand, Tibet, Vietnam. It is an introduced species in the East Aegean Islands, Hawaii, and Vanuatu.

== Cultivation ==
Buddleja asiatica is not completely hardy in the UK, but can be grown reliably against a south-facing wall in coastal areas of the south and west, where it tolerates temperatures down to around 0 °C (32 °F). A specimen is grown under glass by Longstock Park Nursery, near Stockbridge, Hampshire, one of the four NCCPG national collection holders. Hardiness: RHS H3, USDA zones 9–10. Owing to its wide ecological range, adaptation to disturbed areas, elevation and rainfall tolerance, it readily naturalizes in tropical regions and can become invasive.

== Uses ==
In Nepal leaves of B. asiatica are collected as fodder for domesticated animals, and the trunk is cut for firewood. During Thangmi wedding rituals, the female relatives of the groom wear necklaces made of the white flower.
