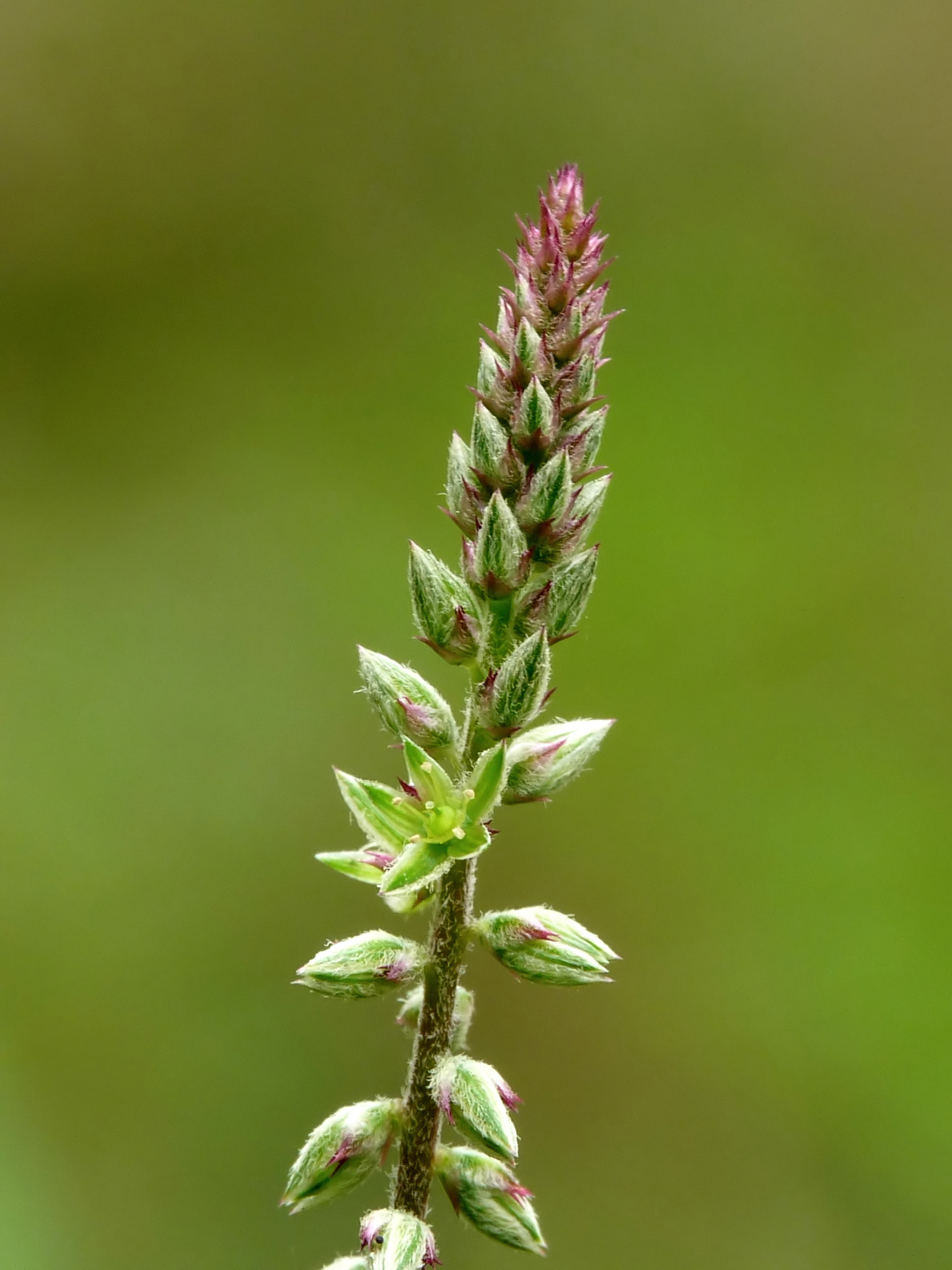

Scientific classification
- Kingdom: Plantae
- Clade: Tracheophytes
- Clade: Angiosperms
- Clade: Eudicots
- Order: Caryophyllales
- Family: Amaranthaceae
- Genus: Achyranthes
- Species: A. aspera

Binomial name
- Achyranthes aspera L.

= Achyranthes aspera =

Species of plant

Achyranthes aspera (common names: chaff-flower, prickly chaff flower, devil's horsewhip, Sanskrit: अपामार्ग apāmārga) is a species of plant in the family Amaranthaceae. It is distributed throughout the tropical world. It can be found in many places growing as an introduced species and a common weed. It is an invasive species in some areas, including many Pacific Islands environments.

== Description ==
- Habit: a wild, perennial, erect herb.
- Stem: herbaceous but woody below, erect, branched, cylindrical, solid, angular, hairy, longitudinally striated, nodes and internodes are prominent, green but violet or pink at nodes.
- Leaves: ramal and cauline, simple, exstipulate, opposite decussate, petiolate, ovate or obovate, entire, acute or acuminate, hairy all over, unicostate reticulate.
- Inflorescence: a spike with reflexed flowers arranged on long peduncle.
- Flowers: bracteate, bracteolate, bracteoles two, shorter than perianth, dry, membranous and persistent, sessile, complete, hermaphrodite, actinomorphic, pentamerous, hypogynous, small, spinescent, green.
- Bracts: ovate, persistent, awned.
- Perianth: made up of 5 tepals, polyphyllous, imbricate or quincuncial, green, ovate to oblong, persistent.
- Androecium: made up of 10 stamens, out of which 5 are fertile and 5 are scale-like, fimbriated, sterile staminodes, both alternating with each other, fertile stamens are antiphyllous, monadelphous, filaments slightly fused at the base, dithecous, dorsifixed or versatile, introrse.
- Gynoecium: it is bicarpellary, syncarpous, superior, unilocular, ovule one, basal placentation, style single and filiform, stigma capitate.
- Fruits: oblong utricle
- Seeds: endospermic with curved embryo, 2 mm long, oblong black.
- Flowering and Fruiting time: September to April

== Uses ==
The juice of this plant is a potent ingredient for a mixture of wall plaster, according to the Samarāṅgaṇa Sūtradhāra, which is a Sanskrit treatise dealing with Śilpaśāstra (Hindu precepts of art and construction).

=== Traditional medicine ===
In the Caribbean region during the 20th century, A. aspera was used in traditional medicine as a decoction tea of boiled leaves and roots.

== Chemical constituents ==
Achyranthes aspera contains triterpenoid saponins which possess oleanolic acid as the aglycone. Ecdysterone, an insect moulting hormone, and long chain alcohols are also found in Achyranthes aspera.

== Gallery ==
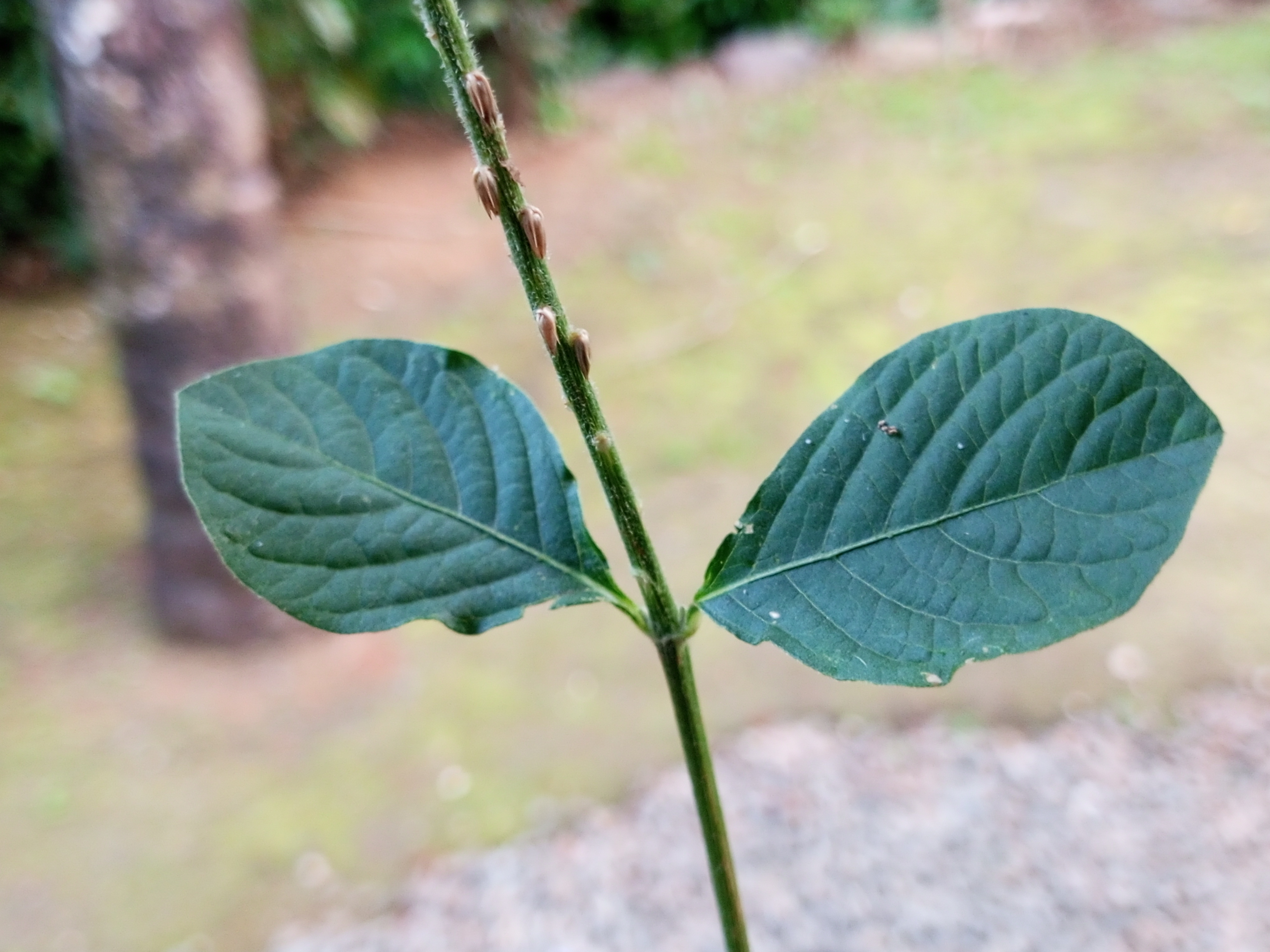
Opposite leaf arrangement and seeds attached to long peduncle

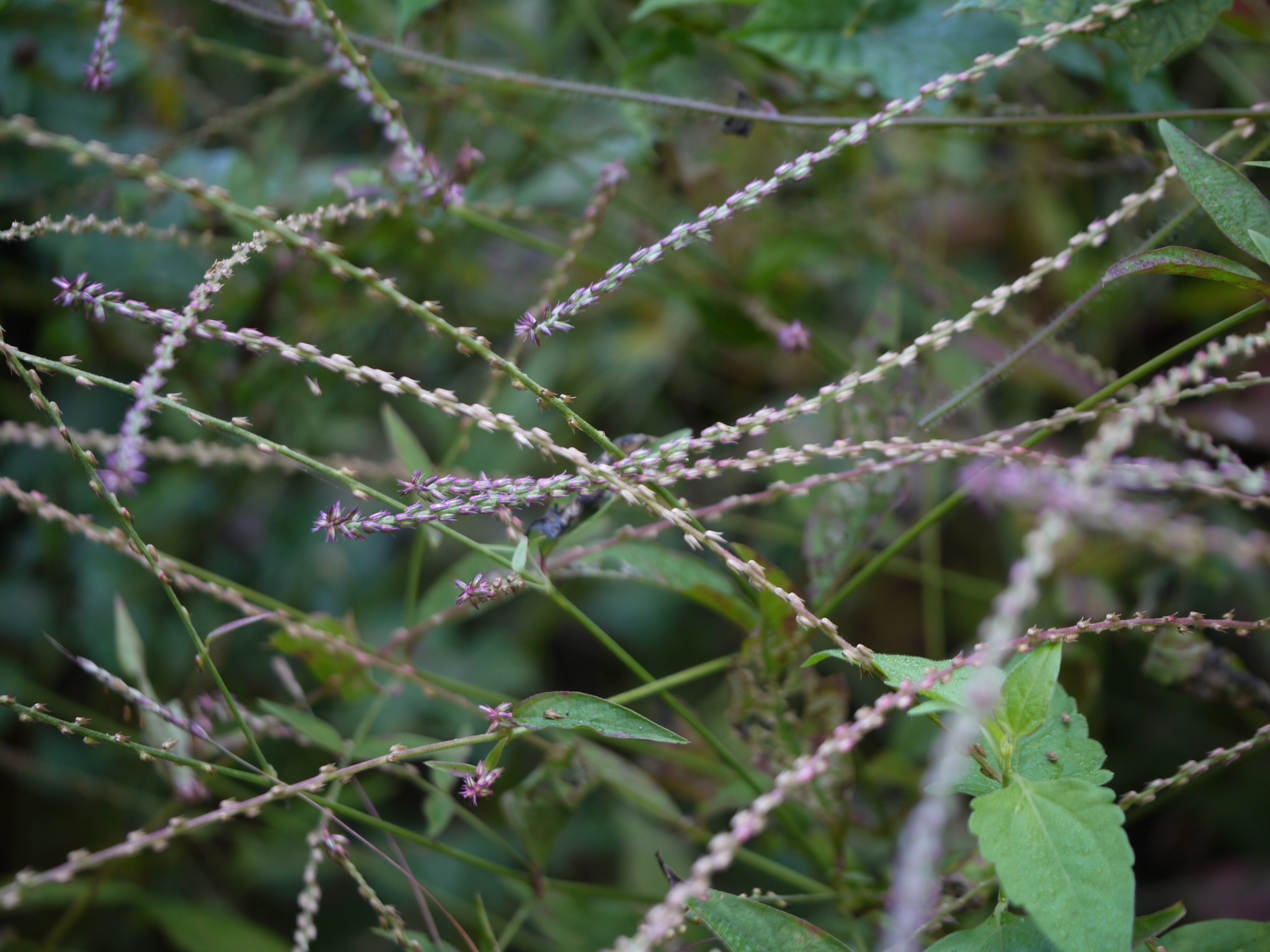
Tangle of long peduncles ("devil's horsewhip") with sharp seeds

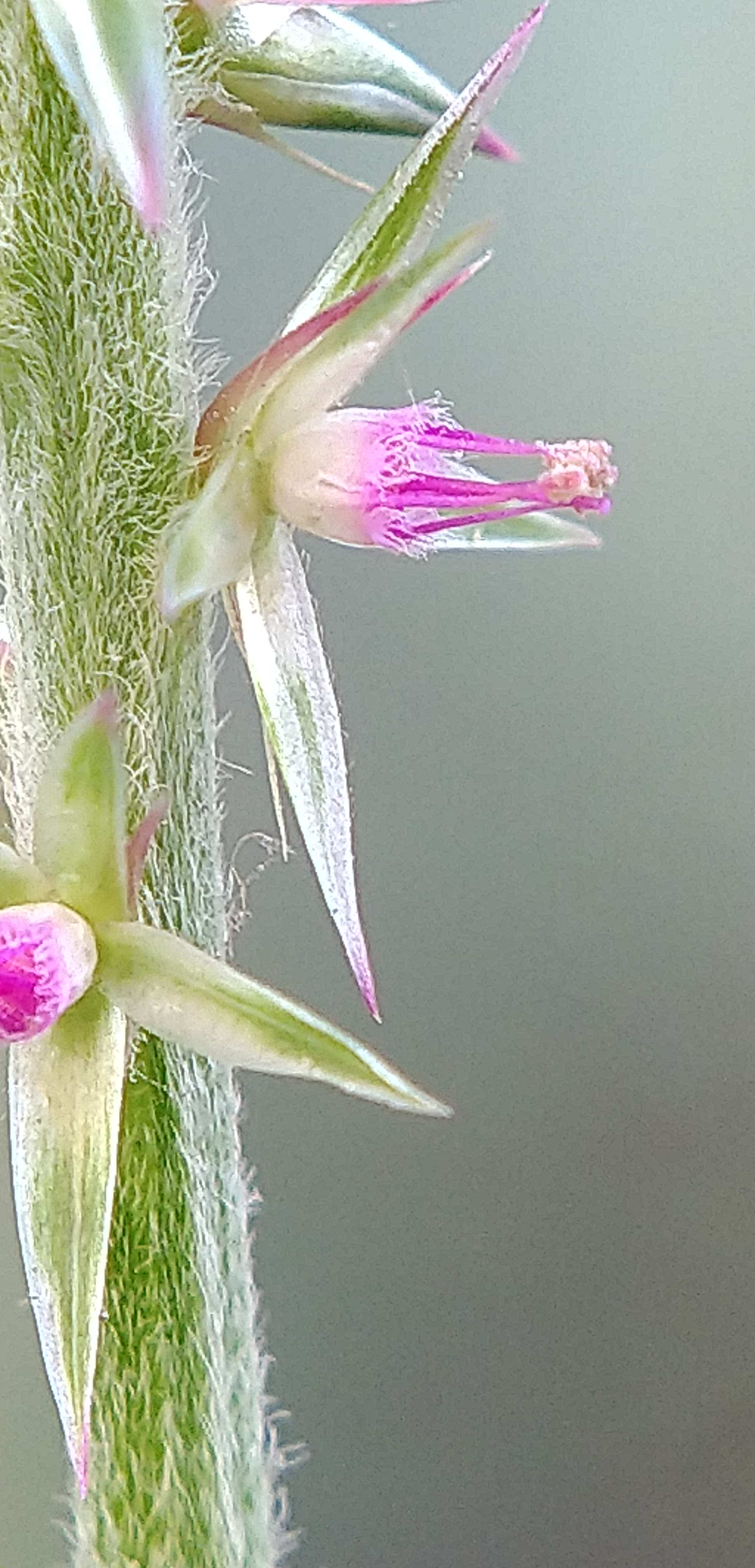
Flowers and hirsute stem

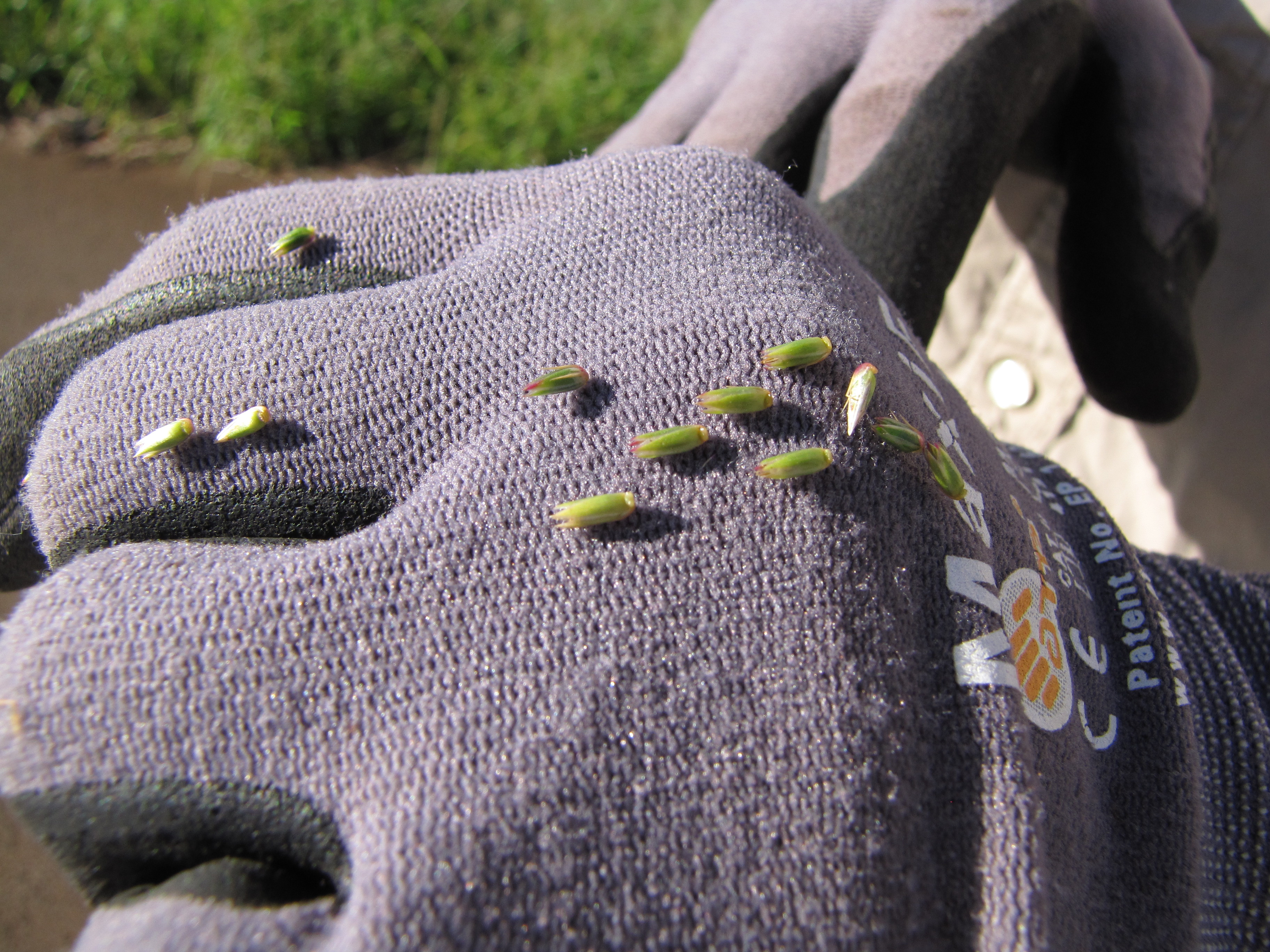
Sharp seeds adherent to glove
