= Geography of Bolivia =

Coordinates: 17°00′S 65°00′W

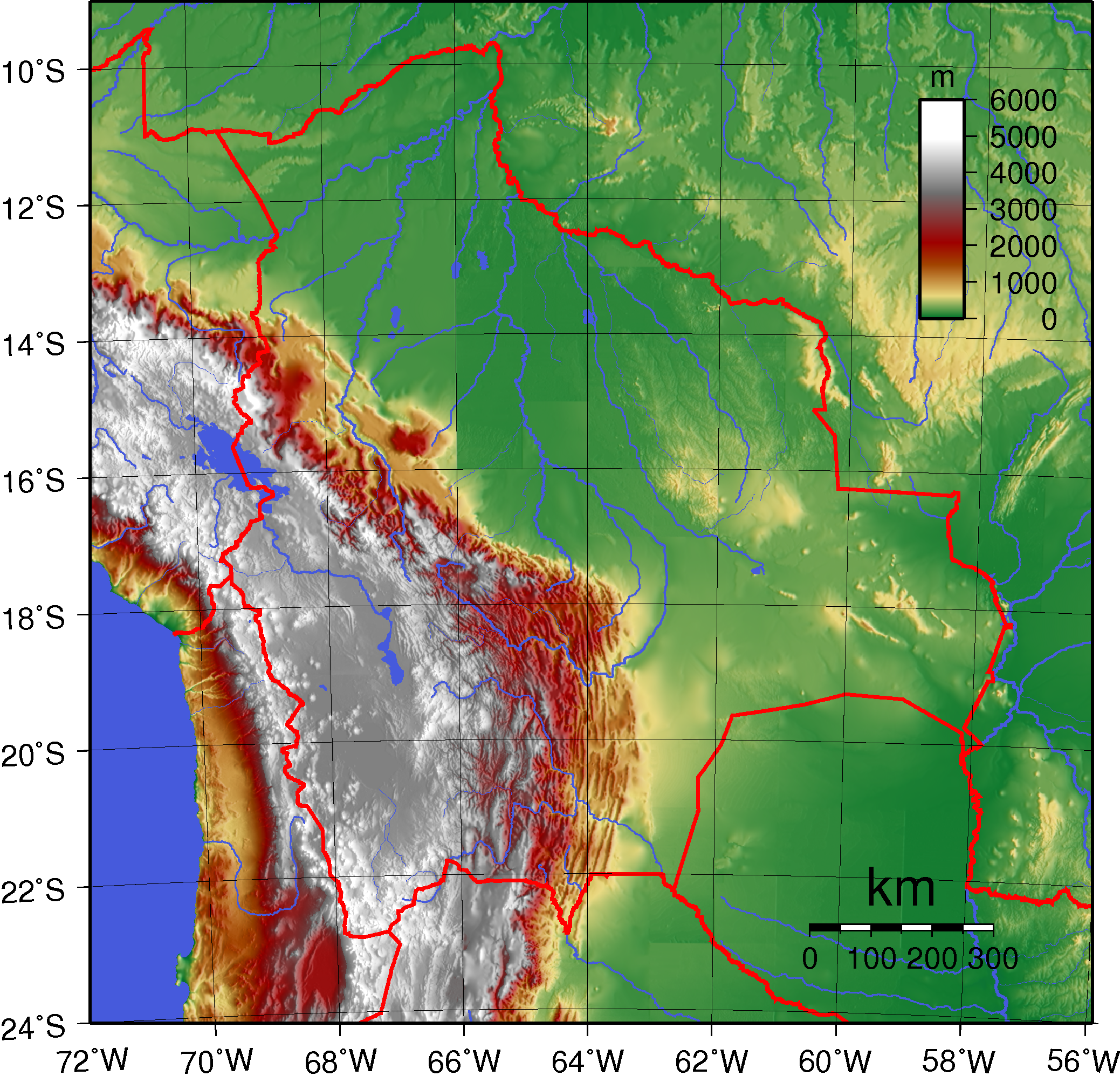
Topographic map of Bolivia showing (east to west) plains of Amazon Basin in green, Sub-Andean Zone in red, Eastern Cordillera in white, Altiplano in gray, and Western Cordillera in white, with Lake Titicaca in blue along the northwest border

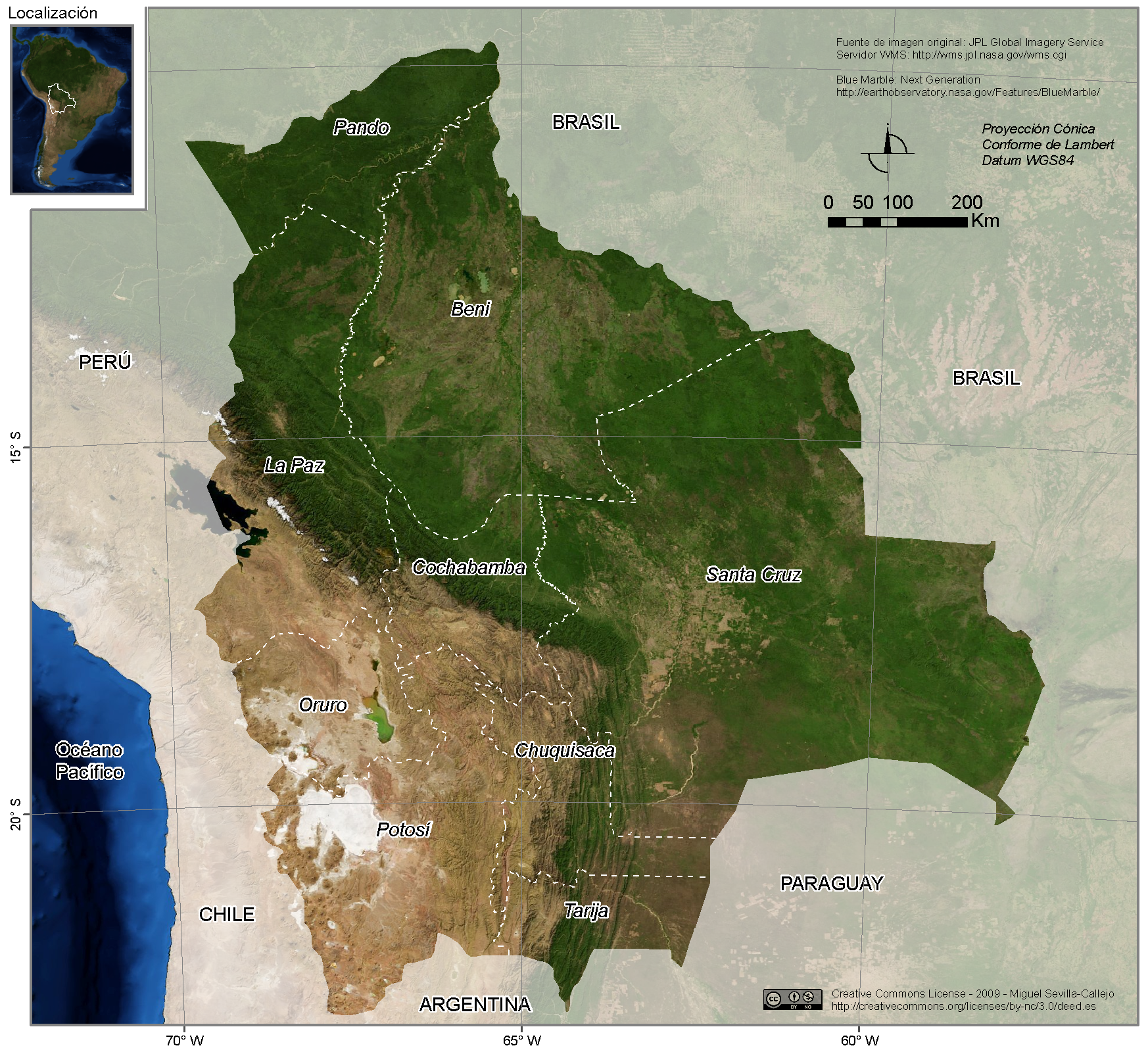
Satellite image of Bolivia from space

The geography of Bolivia includes the Eastern Andes Mountain Range (also called the Cordillera Oriental) which bisects Bolivia roughly from north to south. To the east of that mountain chain are lowland plains of the Amazon and Paraná basins, and to the west is the Altiplano which is a highland plateau where Lake Titicaca –the highest navigable lake on Earth– and a series of salt flats are located.

Politically, is one of the two landlocked countries in South America, the other being Paraguay, which is located along Bolivia's southeast border. To the north and east Bolivia shares the longest border in South America with Brazil. To the west Bolivia's border with Peru runs from the Amazon lowlands to the Altiplano and across Lake Titicaca. To the southwest the border with Chile roughly follows the Western Cordillera on the fringes of the Atacama Desert which hosts numerous volcanoes. The southern border with Argentina follows a mix of natural features and latitudinal parallels. The border to Paraguay runs across the Gran Chaco and is made of a series of lines in a flat terrain.

Most population and economic activity in Bolivia is concentrated along an east-west axis running from Santa Cruz de la Sierra, through Cochabamba to La Paz. From colonial times up to at least the mid 20th century a north-south axis from La Paz through Oruro to Potosí was economically more important as these southern regions provided much of the world's tin and silver output. The region around Tarija in the far south stands out for its large gas reserves. The largest city in Bolivia is Santa Cruz de la Sierra, an agricultural powerhouse.

Culturally the country is often divided into highlands and lowlands as understood by the demonyms of Camba and Colla, with the Chapacoa of Tarija being a smaller third group.

== Overview ==
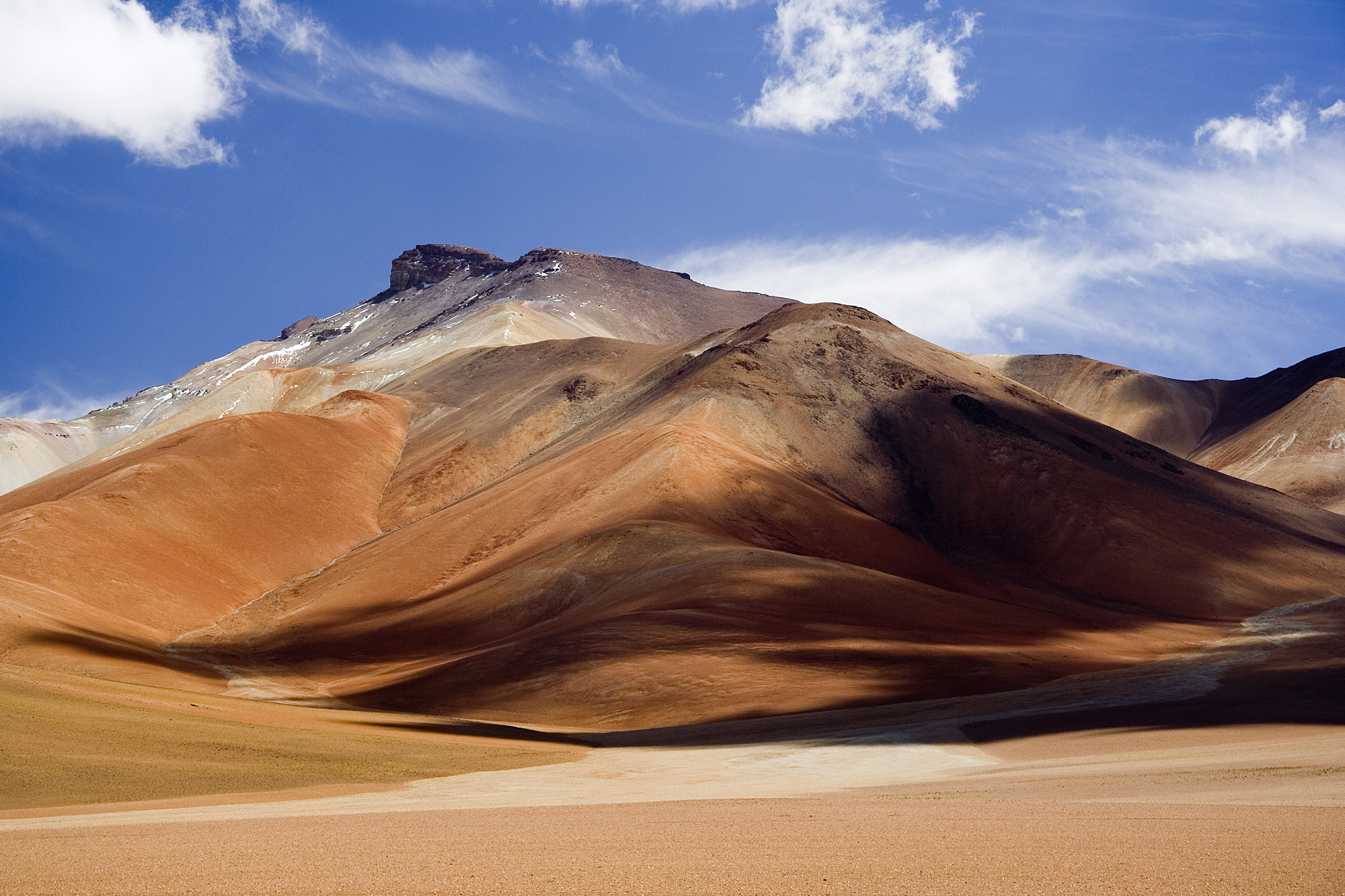
Colors of Altiplano Boliviano.

The most prominent feature of the Altiplano is the large lake at its northern end, Lake Titicaca. At 3,811 m (12,503 ft) above sea level. With a surface area of 9,064 km^{2} (3,500 sq mi), it is larger than Puerto Rico and is South America's second-largest lake by surface area. Lake Titicaca is also deep, about 370 m (1,214 ft) at its deepest, with an average depth of 215 m (705 ft); its volume of water is large enough to maintain a constant temperature of 10 °C (50 °F). The lake actually moderates the climate for a considerable distance around it, making crops of maize and wheat possible in sheltered areas.

Lake Titicaca drains southward through the slow-moving, reed-filled Desaguadero River to Lake Poopó. In contrast to the freshwater Lake Titicaca, Lake Poopó is salty and shallow, with depths seldom more than 4 m (13 ft).

Natural regions of Bolivia

In western Bolivia, the Cordillera Occidental is a chain of dormant volcanoes and solfataras, volcanic vents emitting sulfurous gases. Bolivia's highest peak, the snowcapped Nevado Sajama 6,542 m (21,463 ft), is located here. The entire Cordillera is of volcanic origin and an extension of the volcanic region found in southern Peru. Most of the northern part of this range has an elevation of about 4,000 m (13,123 ft); the southern part is somewhat lower. Rainfall, although scanty everywhere, is greater in the northern half, where the land is covered with scrub vegetation. The southern area receives almost no precipitation, and the landscape consists mostly of barren rocks. All of the Cordillera Occidental regions are sparsely populated, and the south is virtually uninhabited.

The Altiplano, the high plateau between the previous range, and the Cordillera Oriental, comprises four major basins formed by mountainous spurs that jut eastward from the Cordillera Occidental about halfway to the Cordillera Oriental. Along the Altiplano's eastern side is a continuous flat area, which has served as Bolivia's principal north–south transport corridor since colonial times. The entire Altiplano was originally a deep rift between the cordilleras that gradually filled with highly porous sedimentary debris washed down from the peaks. This sedimentary origin explains its gradual slope from north to south; greater rainfall in the north has washed a larger quantity of debris onto the platform floor.

Rainfall in the Altiplano decreases towards the south, and the scrub vegetation grows more sparse, eventually giving way to barren rocks and dry red clay. The land contains several salt flats, the dried remnants of ancient lakes. The largest of these – and the world's largest salt concentration – is the Uyuni Saltpan, which covers over 9,000 square kilometers. The salt is more than five meters deep in the center of this flat. In the dry season, the lake bed can be traversed by heavy trucks. Near the Argentine border, the floor of the Altiplano rises again, creating hills and volcanoes that span the gap between the eastern and western cordilleras of the Andes.

The much older Cordillera Oriental enters Bolivia on the north side of Lake Titicaca, extends southeastward to approximately 17 south latitude, then broadens and stretches south to the Argentine border. The northernmost part of the Cordillera Oriental, the Cordillera Real, is an impressive snow-capped series of granite mountains. Some of these peaks exceed 6,000 m (19,685 ft) and two – Illimani 6,424 m (21,076 ft), which overlooks the city of La Paz, and Illampu 6,424 m (21,076 ft) – have large glaciers on their upper slopes. South of 17 south latitudes, the range changes character. Called the Cordillera Central here, the land is a large block of the Earth's crust that has been lifted and tilted eastward. The western edge of this block rises in a series of cliffs from the Altiplano. The backbone of the cordillera is a high, rolling plain, with elevations from 4,200 to 4,400 m (13,780 to 14,436 ft), interspersed with irregularly spaced high peaks. Too high to be exploited for large-scale commercial grazing, this area takes its name from the predominant vegetation type, the puna. Bolivia has three drainage basins:

- The first is the Amazon Basin, also called the North Basin (724,000 km^{2} (280,000 sq mi)/66% of the territory). The rivers of this basin generally have big meanders which form lakes such as Murillo Lake in Pando Department. The main Bolivian tributary to the Amazon basin is the Mamoré River, with a length of 2,000 km (1,200 mi) running north to the confluence with the Beni River, 1,113 km (692 mi) in length and the second most important river of the country. The Beni River, along with the Madeira River, forms the main tributary of the Amazon River. From east to west, the basin is formed by other important rivers, such as the Madre de Dios River, the Orthon River, the Abuna River, the Yata River, and the Guaporé River. The most important lakes are Rogaguado Lake, Rogagua Lake, and Jara Lake.
- The second is the Río de la Plata Basin, also called the South Basin (229,500 km^{2} (88,600 sq mi)/21% of the territory). The tributaries in this basin are in general less abundant than the ones forming the Amazon Basin. The Rio de la Plata Basin is mainly formed by the Paraguay River, Pilcomayo River, and Bermejo River. The most important lakes are Uberaba Lake and Mandioré Lake, both located in the Bolivian marshland.
- The third basin is the Central Basin, which is an endorheic basin (145,081 square kilometers (56,016 sq mi)/13% of the territory). The Altiplano has large numbers of lakes and rivers that do not run into any ocean because they are enclosed by the Andean mountains. The most important river is the Desaguadero River, with a length of 436 km (271 mi), the longest river of the Altiplano; it begins in Lake Titicaca and then runs in a southeast direction to Poopó Lake. The basin is then formed by Lake Titicaca, Lake Poopó, the Desaguadero River, and great salt flats, including the Salar de Uyuni and Coipasa Lake.

In Bolivia forest cover is around 47% of the total land area, equivalent to 50,833,760 hectares (ha) of forest in 2020, down from 57,804,720 hectares (ha) in 1990. In 2020, naturally regenerating forest covered 50,771,160 hectares (ha) and planted forest covered 62,600 hectares (ha). Of the naturally regenerating forest 0% was reported to be primary forest (consisting of native tree species with no clearly visible indications of human activity) and around 24% of the forest area was found within protected areas. For the year 2015, 100% of the forest area was reported to be under public ownership.

== Valleys ==
The northeastern flank of the Cordillera Real is known as the Yungas, from the Aymara and Quechua word yunka meaning "warm valley". The steep, almost inaccessible slopes and peaks of this mainly semitropical valley area northeast of La Paz offer some of the most spectacular scenery in Bolivia. Rainfall is heavy, and lush vegetation clings to the sides of narrow river valleys. The land is among the most fertile in Bolivia, but poor transport has hindered its agricultural development. The government attempted to build a railway through the Yungas in 1917 to connect La Paz with the eastern lowlands. The railway was abandoned, however, after completion of only 150 kilometres.

The eastern slopes of the Cordillera Central descend gradually in a series of complex north–south ranges and hills. Rivers, draining to the east, have cut long narrow valleys; these valleys and the basins between the ranges are favorable areas for crops and settlement. Rich alluvial soils fill the low areas, but erosion has followed the removal of vegetation in some places. The valley floors range from 2,000 to 3,000 metres above sea level, and this lower elevation means milder temperatures than those of the Altiplano. The cities of Sucre, Cochabamba and the upper area of Tarija department, are located in basins of this vast region.

== Lowlands ==
The eastern lowlands include all of Bolivia north and east of the Andes. Although comprising over two-thirds of the national territory, the region is sparsely populated and, until recently, has played a minor role in the economy.

Differences in topography and climate separate the lowlands into three areas. The flat northern area, made up of Beni and Pando Departments and the northern part of Cochabamba Department, consists of rainforest. Because much of the topsoil is underlain by claypan, drainage is poor, and heavy rainfall periodically converts vast parts of the region to swamp. The central area, comprising the northern half of Santa Cruz Department, has gently rolling hills and a drier climate than the north. Forests alternate with savanna, and much of the land has been cleared for cultivation. Santa Cruz, the largest city in the lowlands, is located here, as are most of Bolivia's petroleum and natural gas reserves. The southeastern part of the lowlands is part of the Gran Chaco. Virtually rainless for nine months of the year, this area becomes flooded for the three months of heavy rains. The extreme variation in rainfall supports only thorny scrub vegetation and cattle grazing, although recent discoveries of natural gas and petroleum near the foothills of the Andes have attracted some settlers to the region.

Most of Bolivia's important rivers are found in the water-rich northern parts of the lowlands, particularly in the Alto Beni (Upper Beni), where the land is suitable for crops such as coffee and cacao. The northern lowlands are drained by wide, slow-moving rivers, the three largest of which—the Mamoré, Beni, and Madre de Dios—all flow northward into the Madeira River in Brazil and eventually into the River Amazon. Riverboats along the Beni and the Mamoré carry both passenger and freight traffic; rapids on the Madeira prevent river traffic farther into Brazil. Near the Paraguayan border, shallow sandy streams carry the seasonal runoff into the Pilcomayo or Paraguay rivers. Also, the Pantanal, the world's largest wetland of any kind, has some of its area in Bolivia.

Despite the fact that eastern Bolivia is described as lowland there are some mountains and mountain ranges well beyond the Andes. The most notable of these mountains are the forested Serranías Chiquitanas in eastern Santa Cruz Department.

== Climate ==
Bolivia map of Köppen climate classification zones

Bolivia has several geographical areas and climates, and the three predominant ones are Andean (28% of the territory), sub-Andean (13%), and plains (59%). The climate of Bolivia, especially temperature, is strongly influenced by surface elevation. The climate of Bolivia varies drastically from one ecoregion to the other, from the tropics in the eastern llanos to polar climates in the western Andes. The summers are warm, humid in the east and dry in the west, with rains that often modify temperatures, humidity, winds, atmospheric pressure and evaporation, giving place to very different climates. When the climatological phenomenon known as El Niño takes place, it provokes great alterations in the weather. Winters are very cold in the west, and it snows around the mountain ranges, while in the western regions, windy days are more usual. The autumn is dry in the non-tropical regions.

- Llanos. A humid tropical climate with an average temperature of 30 °C (86 °F). The wind coming from the Amazon rainforest causes significant rainfall. Starting in May, there is low precipitation because of dry winds, and most days have clear skies. Even so, winds from the south, called surazos, can bring cooler temperatures lasting several days. Precipitation in these areas ranges from 1,100mm to 2,000mm per year, with some areas bordering the Southwestern Amazonian moist forests receiving up to 3,000mm per year.
- Chiquitanía. A humid tropical climate with an average temperature of 30 °C (86 °F). The wind coming from the Amazon rainforest causes considerable rainfall, with a short but noticeable dry season typically starting in May. "Surazos" can bring cooler temperatures lasting several days. Precipitation in these areas ranges from 750mm to 1,500mm per year, with remote areas in central eastern Santa Cruz receiving up to 2,000mm per year.
- Selva. A humid tropical climate with an average temperature of 30 °C (86 °F). The Southwestern Bands of the Amazon rainforest for the central and northwestern areas of Bolivia, where temperatures are hot for a majority of the year, with slightly milder winters. Precipitation in these areas ranges from 2,000mm to 4,000mm per year, with some areas around Tunari receiving up to 7,000mm per year.
- Humid Altiplano. Subtropical highland climate-Polar climates, with strong and cold winds. The average temperature ranges from 15 to 20 °C (59 to 68 °F). At night, temperatures descend drastically to slightly above 0 °C (32 °F), while during the day, the weather is dry and solar radiation is high. Ground frosts occur every month, and snow is frequent. Precipitation in these areas ranges between 450mm to 1,300mm per year, with local areas in Lake Titicaca receiving up to 2,000mm per year.
- Dry Altiplano. Desert-Polar climates, with strong and cold winds. The average temperature ranges from 15 to 20 °C (59 to 68 °F). At night, temperatures descend drastically to slightly above 0 °C (32 °F), while during the day, the weather is dry and solar radiation is high. Ground frosts occur every month, and snow is frequent. Precipitation in these areas ranges from 50mm to 400mm per year.
- Temperate Valleys and Yungas. Temperate climate. The humid northeastern winds are pushed to the mountains, making this region very humid and rainy. Temperatures are cooler at higher elevations. Snow occurs at altitudes of 2,000 meters. Precipitation in these areas ranges from 600mm to 2,000mm per year.
- Xeric Valleys. Semiarid climate. The wind shadows created by the steep Bolivian central highlands make these regions dry for much of the year, with bursts of precipitation in summer thunderstorms. Temperatures are cooler at higher elevations. Precipitation in these areas ranges from 350mm to 600mm per year.
- Chaco. Subtropical Semi-arid climate. Rain and humidity in January and the rest of the year, with warm days and cool nights. Precipitation in these areas ranges from 450mm to 1,500mm per year.

=== Examples ===
Bioclimatic landscapes of Bolivia

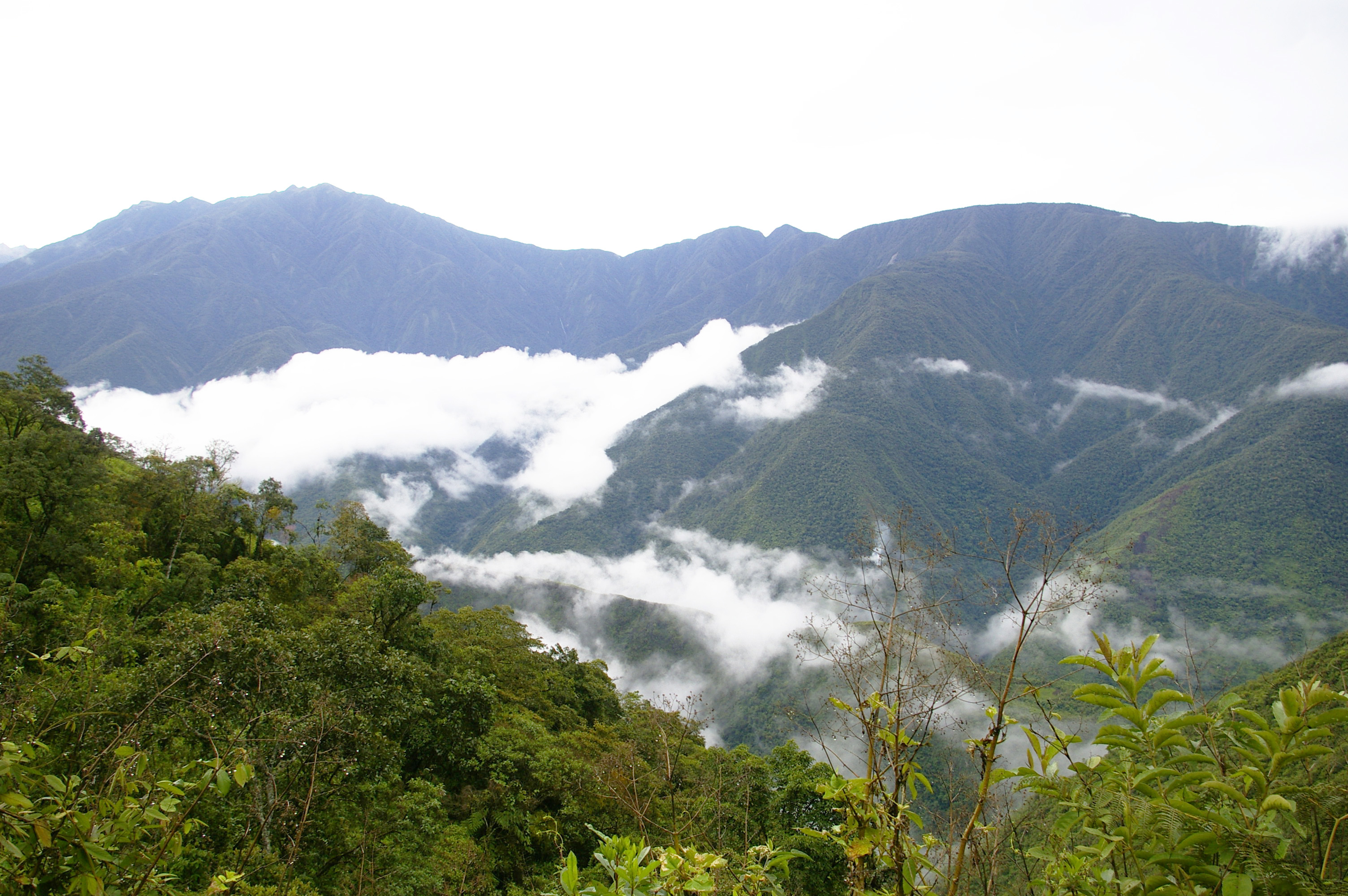
Tropical rainforest Los Yungas, La Paz

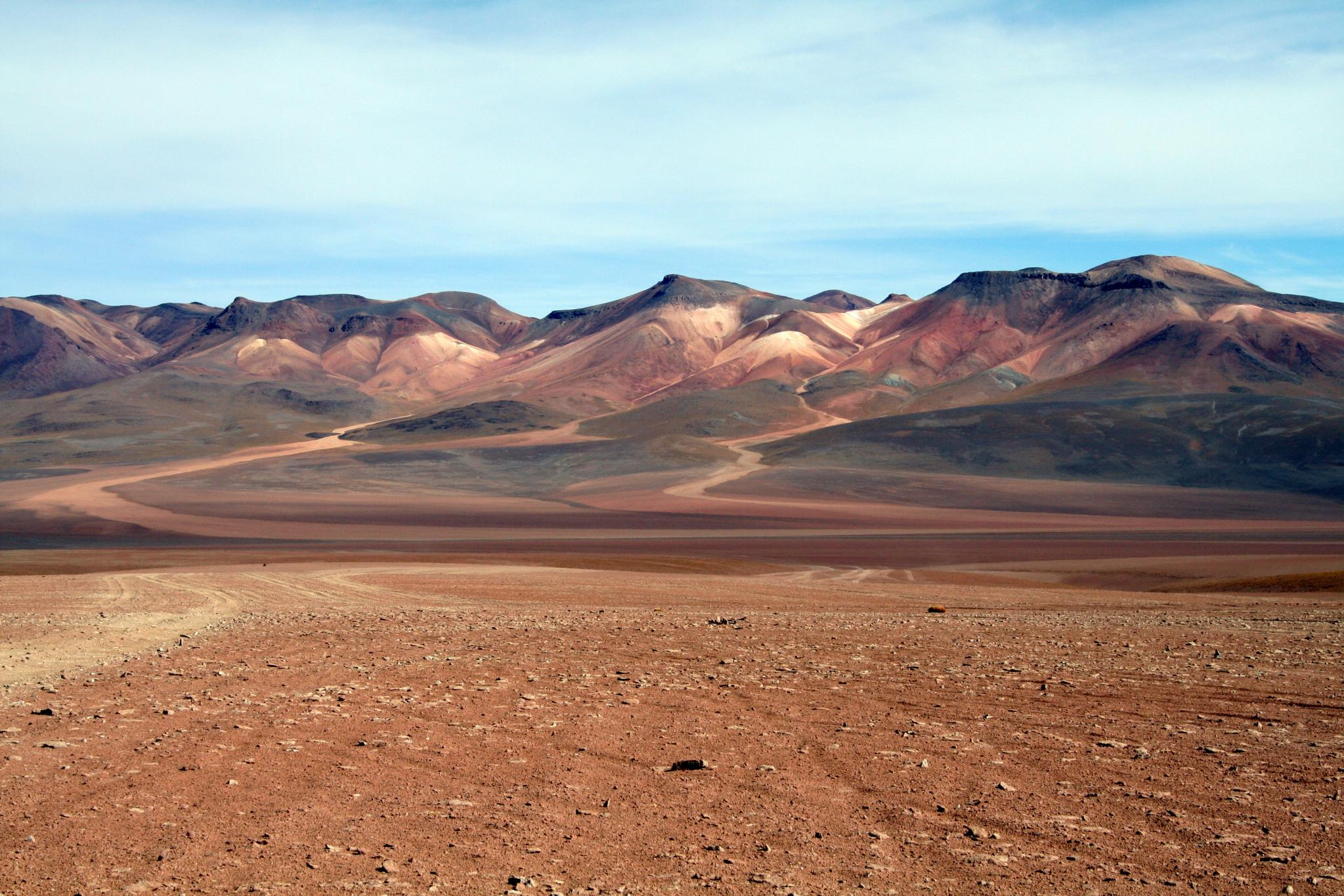
Cold desert Dalí Desert, Potosí

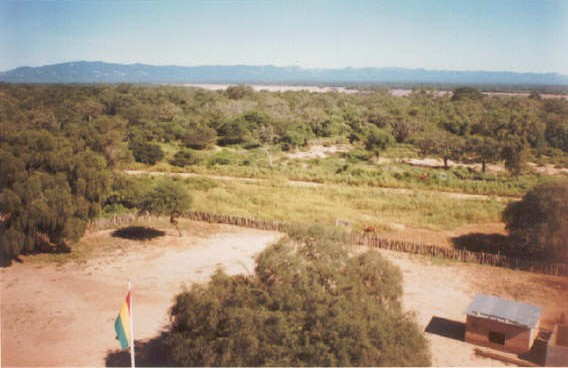
Dry broadleaf forest Chaqueño Forest, Santa Cruz

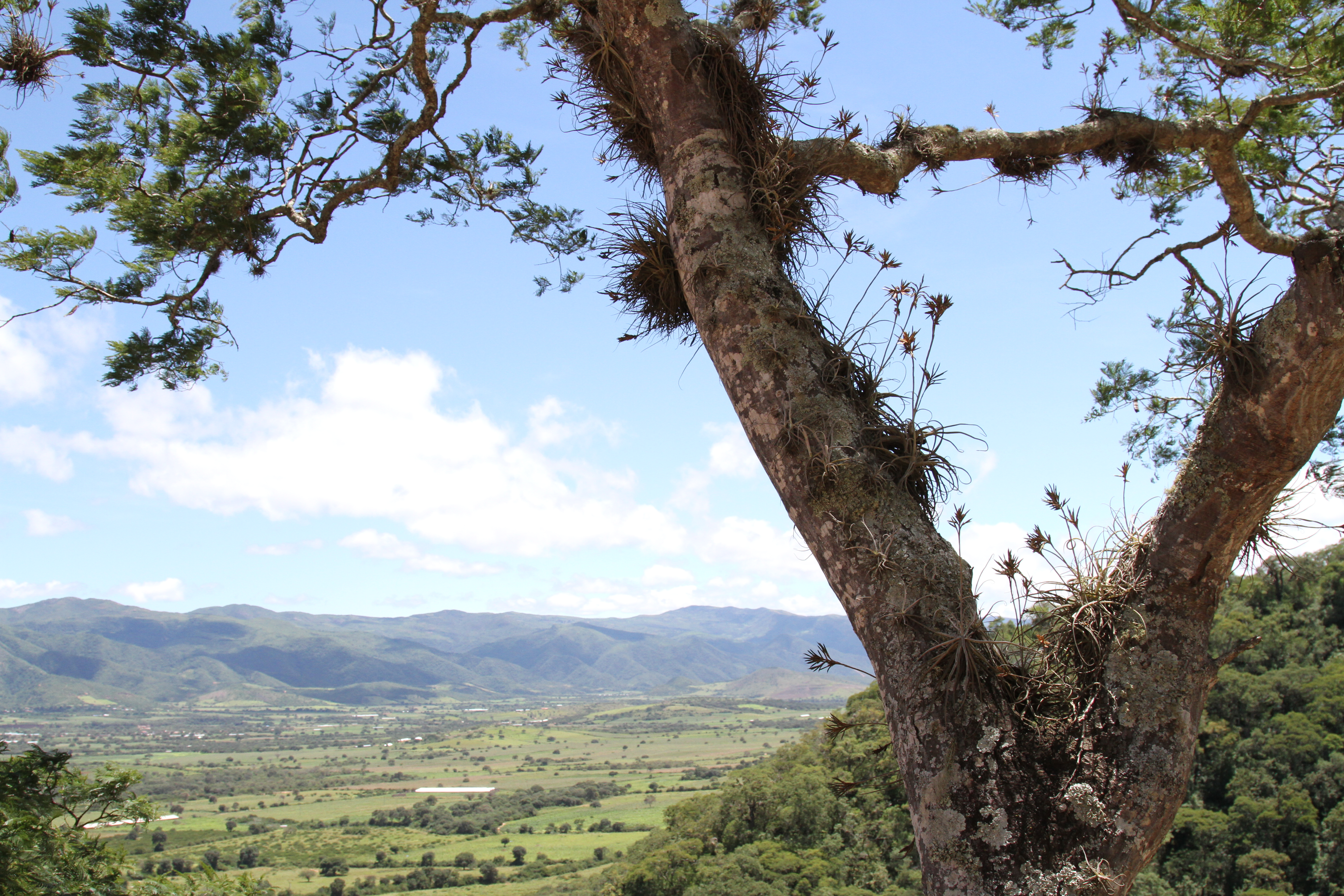
Temperate valley Samaipata, Santa Cruz

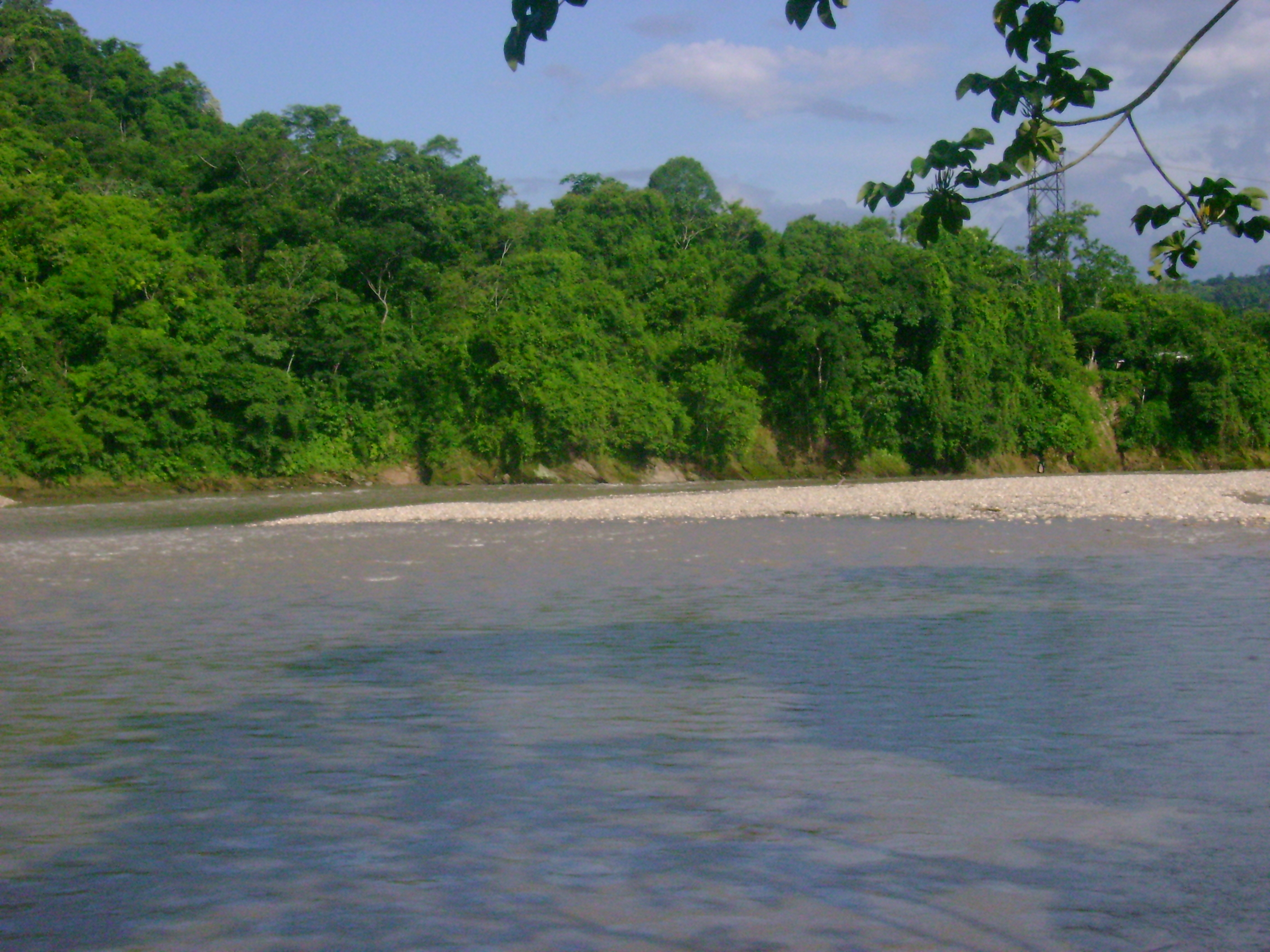
Rainforest; Amazon rainforest, Cochabamba

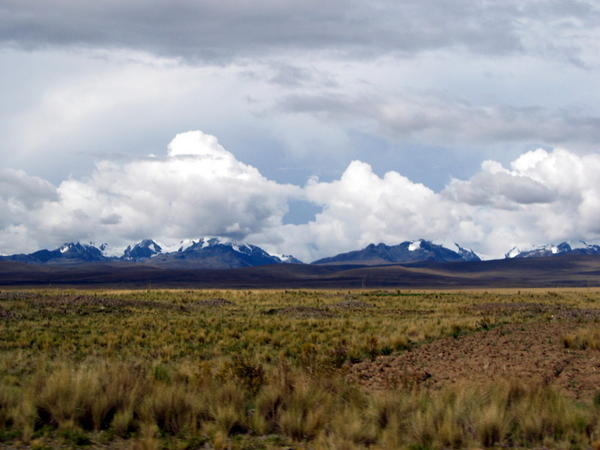
Humid Altiplano; Collao Plateau, La Paz

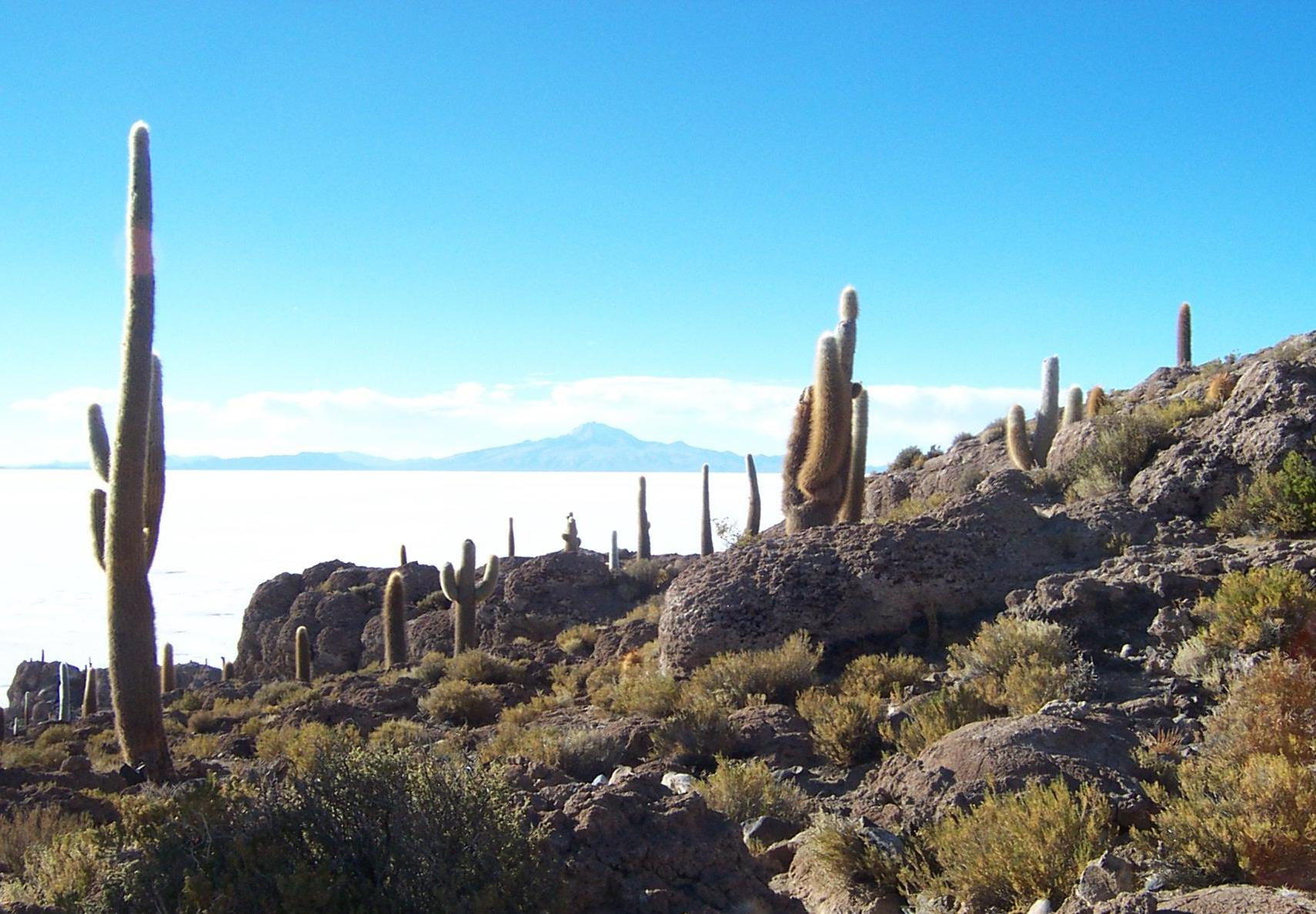
Dry Altiplano; Isla del Pescado, Potosí

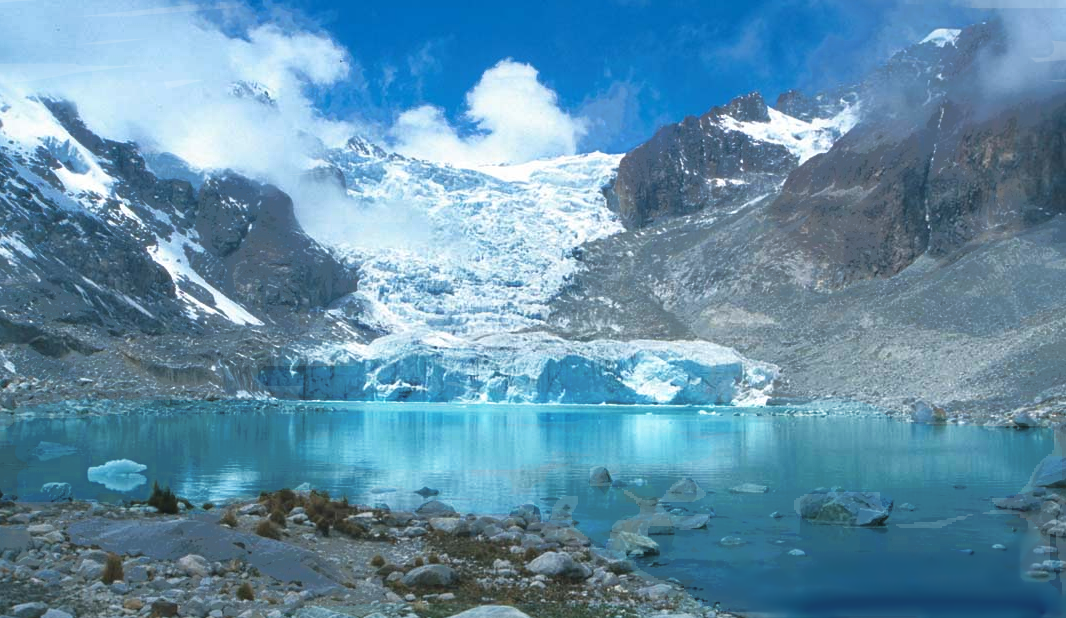
Andean glacier Glaciar Lake, La Paz

Climate data for El Alto, near La Paz (Elevation 4,058 m)
Month	Jan	Feb	Mar	Apr	May	Jun	Jul	Aug	Sep	Oct	Nov	Dec	Year
Record high °C (°F)	25.4 (77.7)	22.8 (73.0)	25.1 (77.2)	22.9 (73.2)	24.0 (75.2)	20.0 (68.0)	23.0 (73.4)	21.0 (69.8)	23.0 (73.4)	23.0 (73.4)	24.2 (75.6)	22.0 (71.6)	25.4 (77.7)
Mean daily maximum °C (°F)	14.3 (57.7)	14.3 (57.7)	14.2 (57.6)	14.4 (57.9)	14.4 (57.9)	14.0 (57.2)	13.5 (56.3)	13.7 (56.7)	15.3 (59.5)	15.3 (59.5)	17.0 (62.6)	15.7 (60.3)	15.0 (59.0)
Daily mean °C (°F)	9.3 (48.7)	9.0 (48.2)	8.9 (48.0)	8.8 (47.8)	8.2 (46.8)	7.3 (45.1)	6.8 (44.2)	8.2 (46.8)	8.7 (47.7)	10.0 (50.0)	10.5 (50.9)	9.7 (49.5)	8.8 (47.8)
Mean daily minimum °C (°F)	4.4 (39.9)	4.4 (39.9)	3.6 (38.5)	1.0 (33.8)	−1.9 (28.6)	−4.3 (24.3)	−4.4 (24.1)	−3 (27)	−1.0 (30.2)	1.5 (34.7)	2.1 (35.8)	3.6 (38.5)	0.5 (32.9)
Record low °C (°F)	−3.3 (26.1)	−3.3 (26.1)	−2.7 (27.1)	−4.7 (23.5)	−10.3 (13.5)	−12.4 (9.7)	−11.9 (10.6)	−10 (14)	−10 (14)	−5.4 (22.3)	−5 (23)	−2.8 (27.0)	−12.4 (9.7)
Average precipitation mm (inches)	133.7 (5.26)	104.7 (4.12)	71.7 (2.82)	31.7 (1.25)	14.3 (0.56)	5.1 (0.20)	7.1 (0.28)	15.2 (0.60)	35.5 (1.40)	38.1 (1.50)	50.5 (1.99)	94.9 (3.74)	602.5 (23.72)
Average precipitation days (≥ 0.1 mm)	20.7	15.8	14.2	9.8	3.6	2.8	2.8	5.1	8.2	10.4	11.5	15.5	120.3
Average snowy days	0.07	0.0	0.0	0.03	0.0	0.03	0.13	0.67	0.37	0.17	0.17	0.03	1.67
Average relative humidity (%)	66	72	67	59	48	42	43	42	48	49	51	60	54
Mean monthly sunshine hours	179.8	155.4	148.8	165.0	229.4	240.0	235.6	226.3	192.0	179.8	171.0	180.0	2,303.1
Mean daily sunshine hours	5.8	5.5	4.8	5.5	7.4	8.0	7.6	7.3	6.4	5.8	5.7	6.0	6.3
Source 1: Deutscher Wetterdienst, Servicio Nacional de Meteorología e Hidrología de Bolivia (snowy days 1981–2010)
Source 2: Meteo Climat (extremes 1942–present)

Climate data for Santa Cruz de la Sierra
Month	Jan	Feb	Mar	Apr	May	Jun	Jul	Aug	Sep	Oct	Nov	Dec	Year
Record high °C (°F)	38.1 (100.6)	37.8 (100.0)	39.3 (102.7)	38.0 (100.4)	34.0 (93.2)	32.2 (90.0)	32.0 (89.6)	35.0 (95.0)	36.4 (97.5)	38.4 (101.1)	40.3 (104.5)	38.4 (101.1)	40.3 (104.5)
Mean daily maximum °C (°F)	30.2 (86.4)	30.5 (86.9)	29.5 (85.1)	27.7 (81.9)	24.9 (76.8)	23.1 (73.6)	23.9 (75.0)	27.7 (81.9)	29.4 (84.9)	29.8 (85.6)	30.7 (87.3)	31.4 (88.5)	28.2 (82.8)
Daily mean °C (°F)	26.8 (80.2)	26.6 (79.9)	26.2 (79.2)	24.7 (76.5)	22.8 (73.0)	20.4 (68.7)	21.1 (70.0)	23.0 (73.4)	25.2 (77.4)	26.4 (79.5)	27.1 (80.8)	27.0 (80.6)	24.8 (76.6)
Mean daily minimum °C (°F)	21.3 (70.3)	21.3 (70.3)	20.5 (68.9)	18.9 (66.0)	16.5 (61.7)	15.4 (59.7)	14.8 (58.6)	16.3 (61.3)	18.7 (65.7)	19.8 (67.6)	20.3 (68.5)	20.9 (69.6)	18.7 (65.7)
Record low °C (°F)	11.6 (52.9)	6.5 (43.7)	5.0 (41.0)	9.9 (49.8)	4.0 (39.2)	1.0 (33.8)	0.0 (32.0)	2.5 (36.5)	5.6 (42.1)	11.9 (53.4)	7.8 (46.0)	14.0 (57.2)	0.0 (32.0)
Average rainfall mm (inches)	227.3 (8.95)	206.8 (8.14)	188.4 (7.42)	89.8 (3.54)	28.4 (1.12)	41.7 (1.64)	40 (1.6)	72.8 (2.87)	104.2 (4.10)	152.8 (6.02)	131.6 (5.18)	156.4 (6.16)	1,441 (56.7)
Average rainy days (≥ 1.0 mm)	14.0	11.1	12.7	9.4	11.4	3.4	1.0	4.0	5.6	7.4	9.4	11.9	111.6
Average relative humidity (%)	79	79	79	78	79	78	73	65	64	67	72	77	74
Source: Deutscher Wetterdienst

Climate data for Sucre
Month	Jan	Feb	Mar	Apr	May	Jun	Jul	Aug	Sep	Oct	Nov	Dec	Year
Record high °C (°F)	34.0 (93.2)	33.5 (92.3)	33.0 (91.4)	32.6 (90.7)	32.1 (89.8)	32.0 (89.6)	29.7 (85.5)	28.0 (82.4)	31.0 (87.8)	33.2 (91.8)	34.9 (94.8)	34.2 (93.6)	34.9 (94.8)
Mean daily maximum °C (°F)	19.5 (67.1)	19.0 (66.2)	19.4 (66.9)	19.3 (66.7)	19.6 (67.3)	19.1 (66.4)	19.4 (66.9)	19.9 (67.8)	20.6 (69.1)	20.8 (69.4)	21.2 (70.2)	20.0 (68.0)	19.8 (67.6)
Daily mean °C (°F)	16.2 (61.2)	15.7 (60.3)	15.8 (60.4)	15.5 (59.9)	14.9 (58.8)	13.8 (56.8)	13.9 (57.0)	14.9 (58.8)	16.2 (61.2)	16.9 (62.4)	17.3 (63.1)	16.7 (62.1)	15.6 (60.1)
Mean daily minimum °C (°F)	12.8 (55.0)	12.3 (54.1)	12.2 (54.0)	11.6 (52.9)	10.2 (50.4)	8.5 (47.3)	8.3 (46.9)	9.9 (49.8)	11.2 (52.2)	12.4 (54.3)	12.8 (55.0)	12.9 (55.2)	11.3 (52.3)
Record low °C (°F)	4.4 (39.9)	5.0 (41.0)	3.3 (37.9)	1.7 (35.1)	−3.9 (25.0)	−2.8 (27.0)	−4.4 (24.1)	−2.2 (28.0)	−1.7 (28.9)	−3.3 (26.1)	−3.3 (26.1)	−1.1 (30.0)	−4.4 (24.1)
Average precipitation mm (inches)	150 (5.9)	126 (5.0)	108 (4.3)	46 (1.8)	10 (0.4)	4 (0.2)	2 (0.1)	14 (0.6)	23 (0.9)	56 (2.2)	72 (2.8)	124 (4.9)	735 (28.9)
Average precipitation days (≥ 1.0 mm)	15	13	12	5	1	1	0	1	4	8	10	12	82
Average relative humidity (%)	67	70	68	62	46	43	39	44	46	47	52	60	54
Source: Deutscher Wetterdienst

Climate data for Potosí (2000–2012)
Month	Jan	Feb	Mar	Apr	May	Jun	Jul	Aug	Sep	Oct	Nov	Dec	Year
Mean daily maximum °C (°F)	15 (59)	15 (59)	16 (61)	17 (63)	15 (59)	14 (57)	14 (57)	15 (59)	16 (61)	18 (64)	18 (64)	17 (63)	15.8 (60.4)
Daily mean °C (°F)	9 (48)	9 (48)	9 (48)	8.5 (47.3)	6.5 (43.7)	5.5 (41.9)	5 (41)	6 (43)	6.5 (43.7)	9.5 (49.1)	10 (50)	10 (50)	7.9 (46.2)
Mean daily minimum °C (°F)	3 (37)	3 (37)	2 (36)	0 (32)	−2 (28)	−3 (27)	−4 (25)	−3 (27)	−1 (30)	1 (34)	2 (36)	3 (37)	0.1 (32.2)
Average precipitation mm (inches)	107.9 (4.25)	97.9 (3.85)	60.0 (2.36)	18.3 (0.72)	3.2 (0.13)	0.7 (0.03)	3.4 (0.13)	3.8 (0.15)	8.9 (0.35)	28.6 (1.13)	32.2 (1.27)	65.8 (2.59)	430.7 (16.96)
Average precipitation days (≥ 1.0 mm)	17	16	12	5	1	0	0	1	2	5	7	14	80
Mean daily sunshine hours	6	6	7	8	9	9	9	9	8	8	7	7	7.75
Source: WeatherWorld

Climate data for Cochabamba
Month	Jan	Feb	Mar	Apr	May	Jun	Jul	Aug	Sep	Oct	Nov	Dec	Year
Record high °C (°F)	35.0 (95.0)	30.0 (86.0)	30.6 (87.1)	30.0 (86.0)	28.9 (84.0)	30.0 (86.0)	28.3 (82.9)	30.6 (87.1)	30.6 (87.1)	32.8 (91.0)	31.7 (89.1)	32.8 (91.0)	35.0 (95.0)
Mean daily maximum °C (°F)	23.9 (75.0)	23.3 (73.9)	24.4 (75.9)	25.0 (77.0)	24.4 (75.9)	23.3 (73.9)	23.3 (73.9)	23.9 (75.0)	25.6 (78.1)	26.1 (79.0)	25.6 (78.1)	25.0 (77.0)	24.5 (76.1)
Daily mean °C (°F)	18.1 (64.6)	17.5 (63.5)	17.5 (63.5)	16.4 (61.5)	14.2 (57.6)	12.2 (54.0)	12.5 (54.5)	13.9 (57.0)	16.7 (62.1)	18.1 (64.6)	18.3 (64.9)	18.3 (64.9)	16.1 (61.0)
Mean daily minimum °C (°F)	12.2 (54.0)	11.7 (53.1)	10.6 (51.1)	7.8 (46.0)	3.9 (39.0)	1.1 (34.0)	1.7 (35.1)	3.9 (39.0)	7.8 (46.0)	10.0 (50.0)	11.1 (52.0)	11.7 (53.1)	7.8 (46.0)
Record low °C (°F)	7.2 (45.0)	3.3 (37.9)	2.2 (36.0)	−1.1 (30.0)	−4.4 (24.1)	−6.7 (19.9)	−5.0 (23.0)	−5.6 (21.9)	−3.3 (26.1)	0.0 (32.0)	5.0 (41.0)	5.6 (42.1)	−6.7 (19.9)
Average precipitation mm (inches)	75.5 (2.97)	137.4 (5.41)	39.9 (1.57)	9.9 (0.39)	6.56 (0.26)	2.0 (0.08)	7.6 (0.30)	7.2 (0.28)	2.4 (0.09)	26.8 (1.06)	29.1 (1.15)	81.8 (3.22)	462.2 (18.20)
Source: Sistema de Clasificación Bioclimática Mundial

Climate data for Tarija (Elevation 1,875 metres (6,152 ft), 1981–2010 normals, extremes 1962–present)
Month	Jan	Feb	Mar	Apr	May	Jun	Jul	Aug	Sep	Oct	Nov	Dec	Year
Record high °C (°F)	36.5 (97.7)	37.4 (99.3)	37.5 (99.5)	37.3 (99.1)	36.2 (97.2)	34.6 (94.3)	36.0 (96.8)	37.4 (99.3)	39.5 (103.1)	39.7 (103.5)	37.8 (100.0)	38.8 (101.8)	39.7 (103.5)
Mean daily maximum °C (°F)	27.1 (80.8)	26.6 (79.9)	26.6 (79.9)	25.9 (78.6)	24.8 (76.6)	24.4 (75.9)	23.9 (75.0)	25.6 (78.1)	26.1 (79.0)	27.5 (81.5)	27.4 (81.3)	27.5 (81.5)	26.1 (79.0)
Daily mean °C (°F)	20.8 (69.4)	20.3 (68.5)	20.2 (68.4)	18.6 (65.5)	15.5 (59.9)	13.6 (56.5)	13.2 (55.8)	15.4 (59.7)	17.0 (62.6)	19.7 (67.5)	20.3 (68.5)	21.0 (69.8)	18.0 (64.4)
Mean daily minimum °C (°F)	14.7 (58.5)	14.1 (57.4)	13.8 (56.8)	11.3 (52.3)	6.3 (43.3)	2.7 (36.9)	2.5 (36.5)	5.2 (41.4)	7.9 (46.2)	11.9 (53.4)	13.3 (55.9)	14.4 (57.9)	9.8 (49.6)
Record low °C (°F)	6.0 (42.8)	4.0 (39.2)	5.0 (41.0)	−2.0 (28.4)	−3.0 (26.6)	−7.7 (18.1)	−9.2 (15.4)	−8.0 (17.6)	−4.2 (24.4)	0.0 (32.0)	3.0 (37.4)	0.0 (32.0)	−9.2 (15.4)
Average precipitation mm (inches)	130.2 (5.13)	100.4 (3.95)	90.3 (3.56)	16.1 (0.63)	1.7 (0.07)	0.2 (0.01)	0.3 (0.01)	1.9 (0.07)	7.0 (0.28)	37.1 (1.46)	73.2 (2.88)	125.9 (4.96)	584.3 (23.00)
Average precipitation days	14.8	12.5	11.2	4.0	1.1	0.3	0.3	0.9	2.6	6.8	10.4	12.8	77.6
Average relative humidity (%)	67.1	68.9	68.6	65.6	58.9	53.0	51.9	50.0	50.8	54.6	59.6	64.1	59.2
Source: Servicio Nacional de Meteorología e Hidrología de Bolivia

== Statistics ==
Terrain: rugged Andes Mountains with a highland plateau (Altiplano), hills, lowland plains of the Amazon Basin

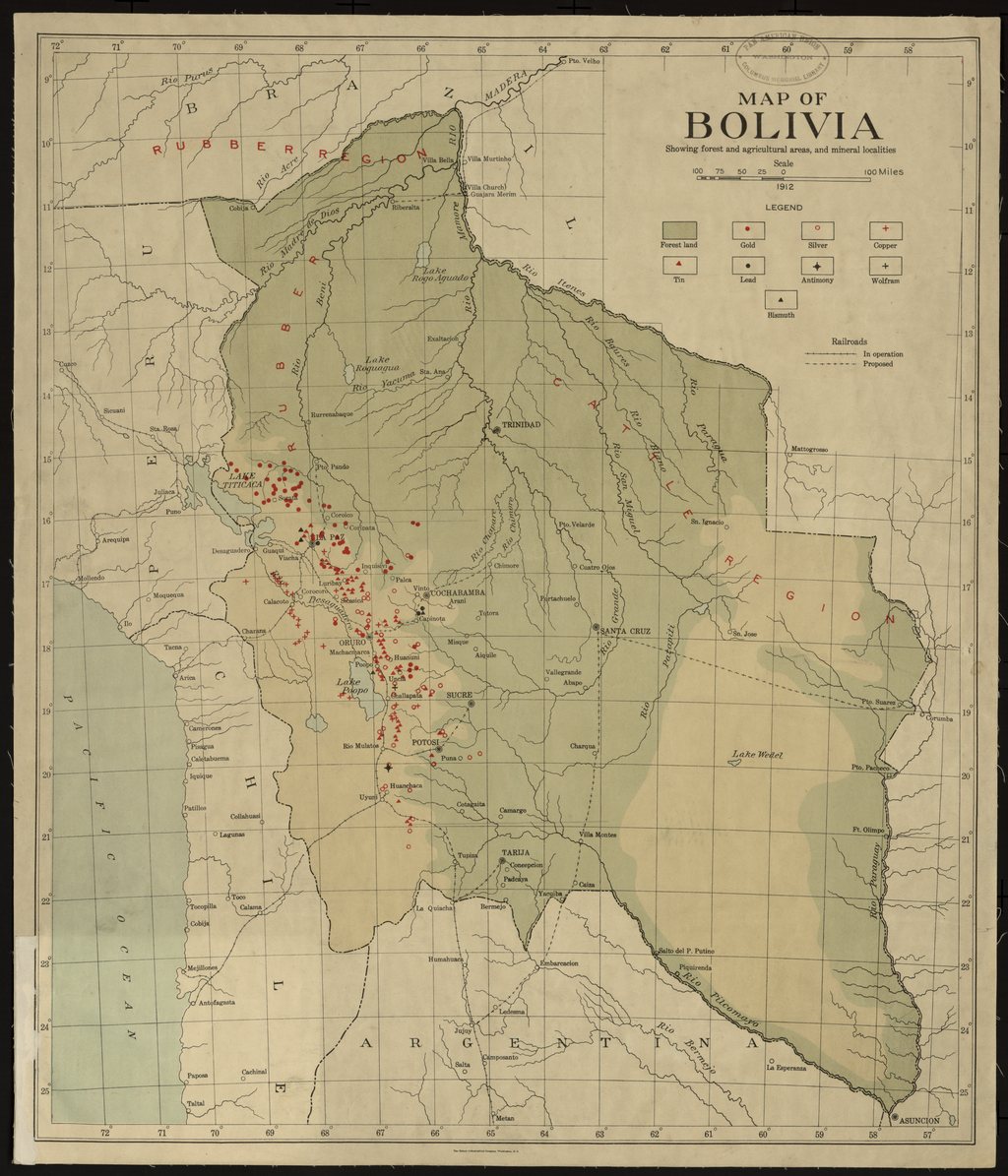
Map showing the location of mines in Bolivia

Natural resources: tin, natural gas, petroleum, zinc, tungsten, antimony, silver, iron, lead, gold, timber, hydro-power

Land borders: Argentina (942 km), Brazil (3,403 km), Chile (942 km), Paraguay (753 km), Peru (1,212 km)

Land use: As of 2016, the population of Bolivia was more urban (66%) than rural (34%).
arable land: 3.97%
permanent crops: 0.20%
other: 95.83% (2012)

Irrigated land: 1,282 km^{2} (2003)

Total renewable water resources: 622.5 cu km (2011)

Freshwater withdrawal (domestic/industrial/agricultural:
total: 2.64 km^{3}/yr (25%/14%/61%)
per capita: 305.8 m^{3}/yr (2005)

Natural hazards: flooding in the northeast (March–April)

Environment – current issues: the clearing of land for agricultural purposes and the international demand for tropical timber are contributing to deforestation; soil erosion from overgrazing and poor cultivation methods (including slash-and-burn agriculture); desertification; loss of biodiversity; industrial pollution of water supplies used for drinking and irrigation

Environment – international agreements:
party to: Biodiversity, Climate Change, Climate Change-Kyoto Protocol, Desertification, Endangered Species, Hazardous Wastes, Law of the Sea, Marine Dumping, Nuclear Test Ban, Ozone Layer Protection, Ship Pollution, Tropical Timber 83, Tropical Timber 94, Wetlands
signed, but not ratified: Environmental Modification, Marine Life Conservation

Geography – note: landlocked; separated from the Pacific Ocean via Chile. Bolivia shares control of Lago Titicaca, world's highest navigable lake (elevation 3,805 m), with Peru

== Location and extreme points ==
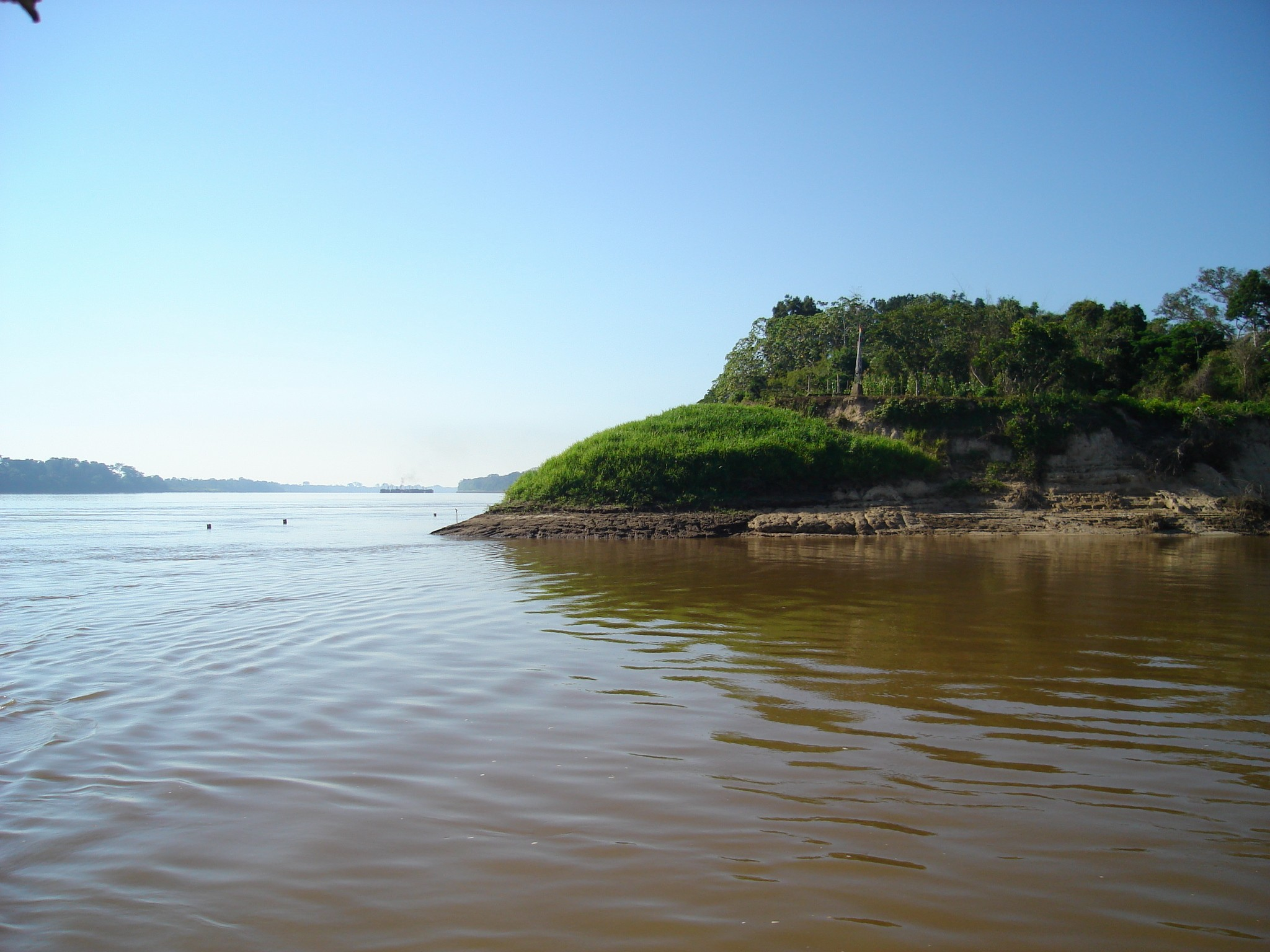
The northernmost point of Bolivia

Bolivia is bordered in the northwest by Peru, and in the southwest by Chile; both Peru and Bolivia are split by the Andes Mountains roughly from north to south, and those two countries therefore have very similar geographic regions, except that Bolivia's Pacific coast was lost to Chile during the War of the Pacific in 1880. Bolivia is also bordered by Brazil in the north and east, by Paraguay in the southeast, and by Argentina in the south.

- Northernmost point – the Madeira River on the border with Brazil, near Ponte sobre o Rio Abunã, Federico Román Province, Pando Department
- Southernmost point – southern tip of the Eduardo Avaroa Andean Fauna National Reserve, Sur Lípez Province, Potosí Department
- Westernmost point – on the border with Peru, José Manuel Pando Province, La Paz Department
- Easternmost point – on the border with Brazil, Germán Busch Province, Santa Cruz Department
- Highest point – Nevado Sajama: 6,542 m
- Lowest point – Rio paraguay: 90 m

== Climate policy ==
Bolivia has also implemented the Bolivian Strategy on Climate Change, which is based on taking action in these four areas:

1. Promoting clean development in Bolivia by introducing technological changes in the agriculture, forestry, and industrial sectors, aimed to reduce GHG emissions with a positive impact on development.
2. Contributing to carbon management in forests, wetlands and other managed natural ecosystems.
3. Increasing effectiveness in energy supply and use to mitigate effects of GHG emissions and risk of contingencies.
4. Focus on increased and efficient observations, and understanding of environmental changes in Bolivia to develop effective and timely responses.

Bolivia comprises about 20% of the world's tropical glaciers, along with the Andes Mountains. However, they are vulnerable to global warming and have lost 43% of their surface area between 1986 and 2014. Some Bolivian glaciers have lost more than two-thirds of their mass since the 1980s points out UNESCO in 2018. While the temperature in the tropical Andes is expected to rise by two to five degrees by the end of the 21st century, glaciers would still lose between 78% and 97% of their mass. Glaciers account for between 60% and 85% of La Paz's water supply, depending on the year. Scientists began alerting the Bolivian government to the problem of melting glaciers in the 1990s, but it was not until 2012 that the authorities responded with real protection policies. A Project for Adaptation to the Impact of Accelerated Glacier Recession in the Tropical Andes (PRAA) was then set up, with the mission to "strengthen the monitoring network" and "generate information useful for decision-making." The glaciers have since been monitored by cameras, probes, drones and satellite. Authorities have also developed programs to educate the population about the consequences of global warming to push back on certain harmful agricultural practices.

In February 2017, the government mobilized $200 million to combat drought and global warming.

== See also ==
- Geology of Bolivia
