= Buddleja aromatica =

Scientific classification
- Kingdom: Plantae
- Clade: Embryophytes
- Clade: Tracheophytes
- Clade: Spermatophytes
- Clade: Angiosperms
- Clade: Eudicots
- Clade: Asterids
- Order: Lamiales
- Family: Scrophulariaceae
- Genus: Buddleja
- Species: B. aromatica

Binomial name
- Buddleja aromatica J. Rémy

Synonyms
- Buddleja andina Britton ex Rusby; Buddleja monocephala Kraenzl.; Buddleja tiraquiensis Kuntze

Species of flowering plant

Buddleja aromatica is endemic to the Cordillera Oriental and Central of Bolivia, and northern Argentina, where it grows on rocky areas amid semi-arid scrub and thorn. The species was first described and named by Rémy in 1847.

== Description ==
Buddleja aromatica is a dioecious shrub, 0.5–2 m tall, with greyish fissured bark. The young branches are subquadrangular and tomentose, bearing sessile subcoriaceous oblong-lanceolate leaves, tomentose to glabrescent above and lanose below, 2–6 cm long by 0.5–1.8 cm wide. The white or creamy white inflorescence is variable, comprising one terminal head, or with up to four additional pairs of pedunculate heads below in the axils of small leaves, each head with 20–30 sessile flowers; the corollas are 3–4 mm long.

The species is very similar to B. cordobensis and B. araucana, but differing in some vegetative and reproductive features. Ploidy: 2n = 38.

== Cultivation ==
The shrub is not known to be in cultivation. A juvenile specimen at the Logan Botanic Garden, Scotland, perished circa 1995.
