= Buddleja cordobensis =

Scientific classification
- Kingdom: Plantae
- Clade: Tracheophytes
- Clade: Angiosperms
- Clade: Eudicots
- Clade: Asterids
- Order: Lamiales
- Family: Scrophulariaceae
- Genus: Buddleja
- Species: B. cordobensis

Binomial name
- Buddleja cordobensis Griseb.

Synonyms
- Buddleja intermedia Lorentz

Species of flowering plant

Buddleja cordobensis is a species of flowering plant in the family Scrophulariaceae. It is endemic to dry hillsides in the Argentine provinces of Córdoba, San Luís, and La Rioja at altitudes of 700–1500 m; it was first described and named by Grisebach in 1874.

== Description ==
Buddleja cordobensis is a dioecious densely branched shrub 1–2 m high, with grey fissured bark. The young branches are terete and tomentose, bearing coriaceous, ovate leaves 2–8 cm long by 0.5–2 cm wide, thickly tomentose on both surfaces, with 0.5 cm petioles. The deep yellow inflorescences comprise one terminal and < 9 pairs of globose heads 0.6–1 cm in diameter, each with 12–25 flowers; the corolla tubes are 3–4 mm long.

The species is considered closely related to B. araucana and B. aromatica.

== Cultivation ==
The shrub is not known in the UK.
