= Serranía del Aguaragüe =

Mountain range in Cordillera Oriental, Bolivia

Coordinates: 21°23′S 63°36′W

Serranía del Aguaragüe is the easternmost range of Bolivia's Cordillera Oriental. Serranía del Aguaragüe stretches out in a north–south fashion from the latitude of crossing the Bolivian departments of Tarija, Chuquisaca and Santa Cruz. Geologically it corresponds to the thrust front where the Andes meets the Bolivian Chaco. The range is largely uninhabited and vegetated by subtropical dry broadleaf forests.

== See also ==
- Geography of Bolivia
- Geology of Bolivia
