= Buddlejaceae =

Family of flowering plants

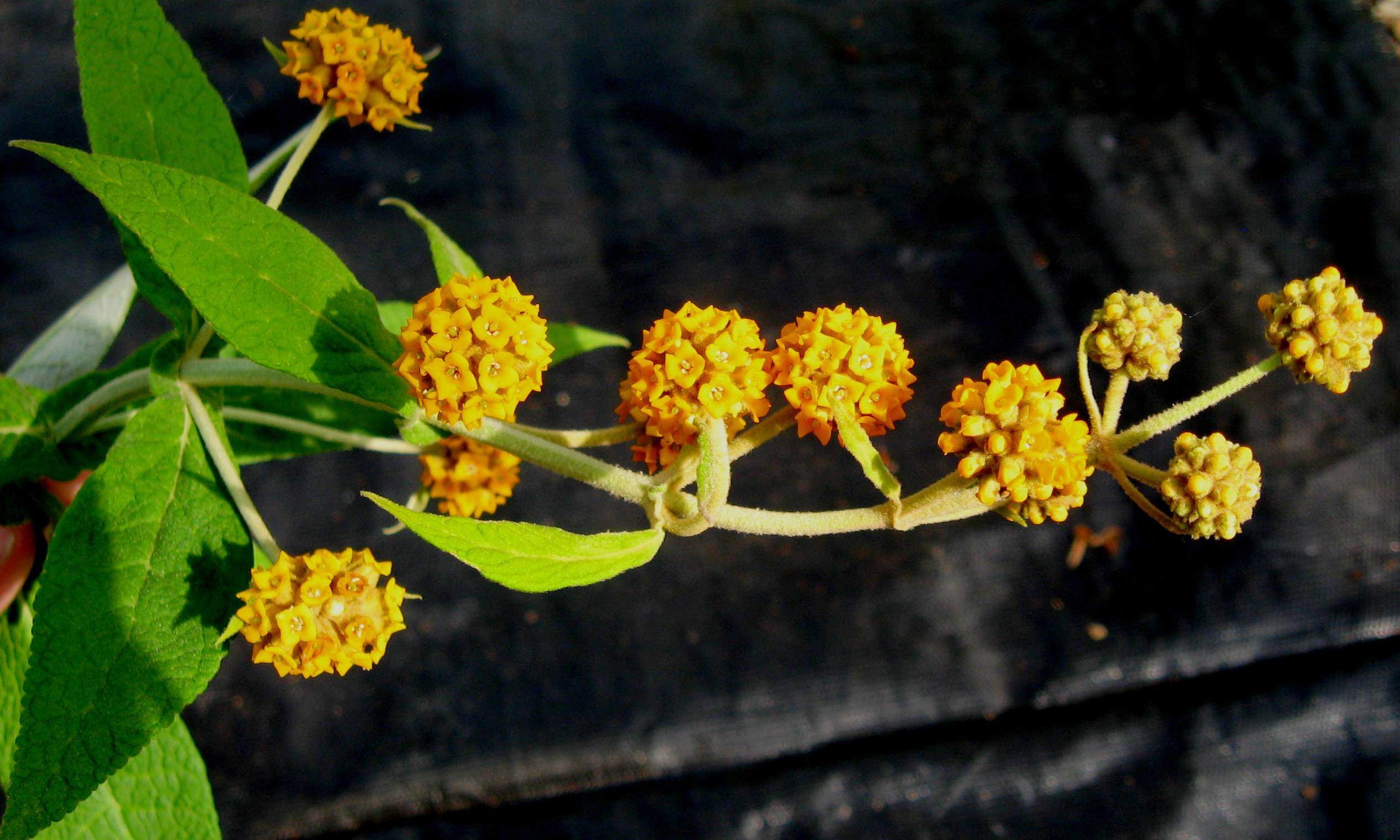
Buddleja araucana

Buddlejaceae is a family of flowering plants that is not currently recognized by the Angiosperm Phylogeny Group, but as of 2016 it is being used by many botanists as one of several small families that divide the Lamiales. Phylogenetic reconstruction has shown that divisions within the Lamiales are unsatisfactory, and a major revision is anticipated that will greatly alter the circumscriptions of the larger families and will temporarily bring widespread ambiguity (as previously happened with the order Asparagales). At present, there is no widely accepted phylogenetic classification of the Lamiales, and for the sake of clarity, some smaller families are widely used, including Buddlejaceae. The genera included in Buddlejaceae are assigned to Scrophulariaceae when Buddlejaceae is not recognized.
