= Geology of Bolivia =

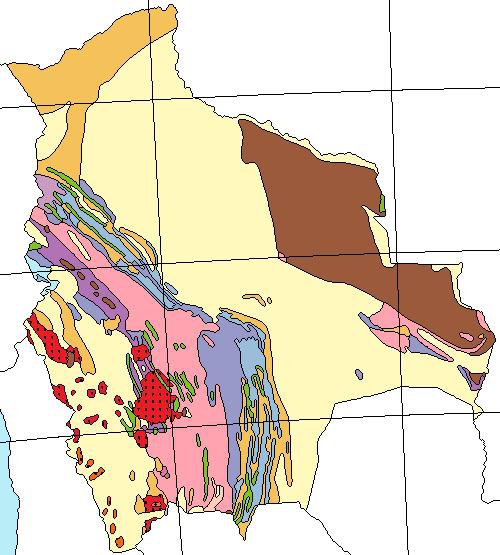
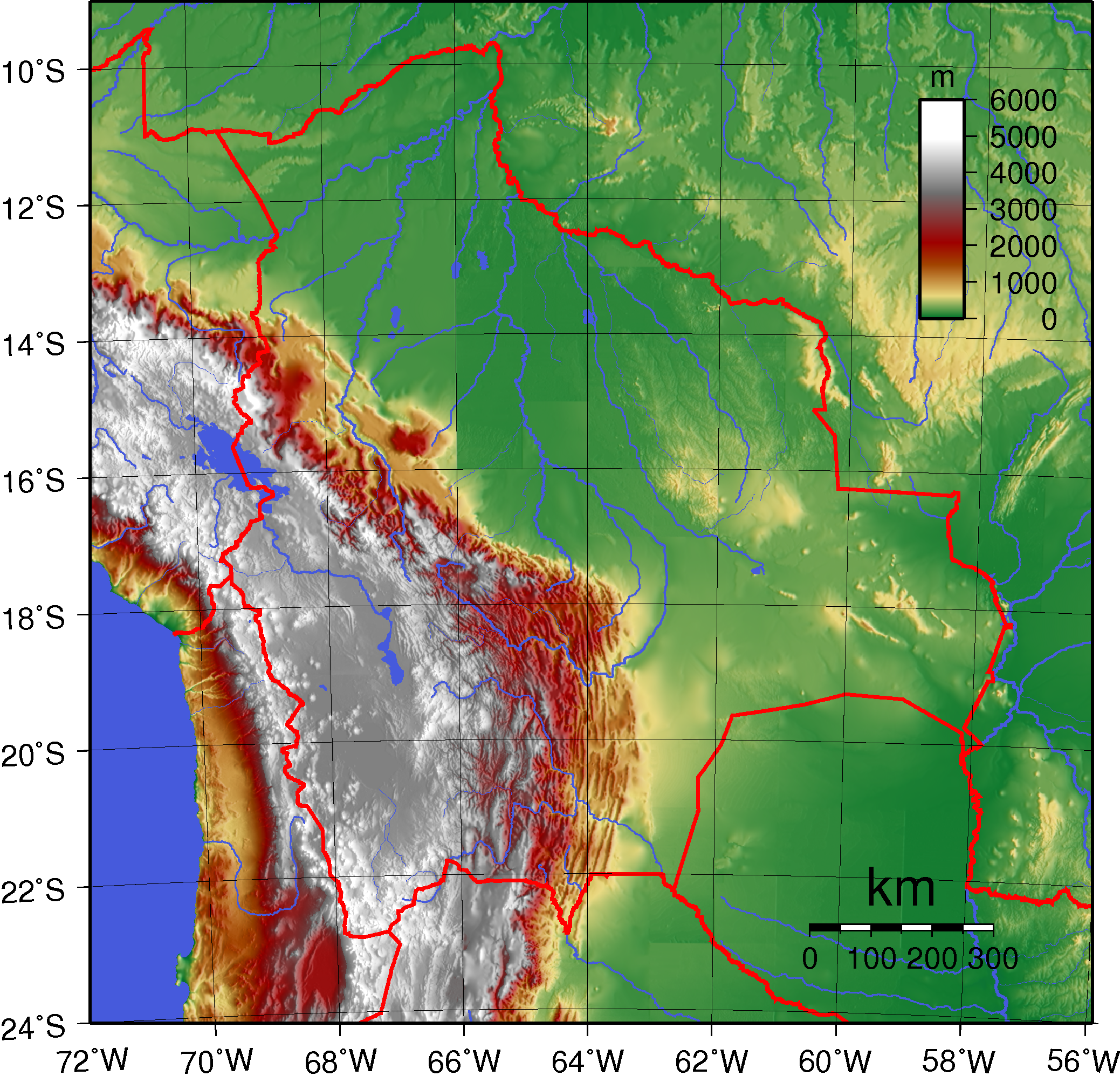
Major geological units (left) in Bolivia coincide with topography (right)
Geological units:
Quaternary deposits
Quaternary volcanics
Tertiary deposits
Cretaceous-Tertiary volcanics
Cretaceous age rocks
Devonian age rocks
Silurian age rocks
Ordovician-Silurian age rocks
Precambrian undifferentiated

The geology of Bolivia comprises a variety of different lithologies as well as tectonic and sedimentary environments. On a synoptic scale, geological units coincide with topographical units. The country is divided into a mountainous western area affected by the subduction processes in the Pacific and an eastern lowlands of stable platforms and shields. The Bolivian Andes is divided into three main ranges; these are from west to east: the Cordillera Occidental that makes up the border to Chile and host several active volcanoes and geothermal areas, Cordillera Central (in some contexts also called Cordillera Oriental) once extensively mined for silver and tin and the relatively low Cordillera Oriental that rather than being a range by its own is the eastern continuation of the Central Cordillera as a fold and thrust belt. Between the Occidental and Central Cordillera the approximately 3,750-meter-high Altiplano high plateau extends. This basin hosts several freshwater lakes, including Lake Titicaca as well as salt-covered dry lakes that bring testimony of past climate changes and lake cycles. The eastern lowlands and sub-Andean zone in Santa Cruz, Chuquisaca, and Tarija Departments was once an old Paleozoic sedimentary basin that hosts valuable hydrocarbon reserves. Further east close to the border with Brazil lies the Guaporé Shield, made up of stable Precambrian crystalline rock.

== Andes ==
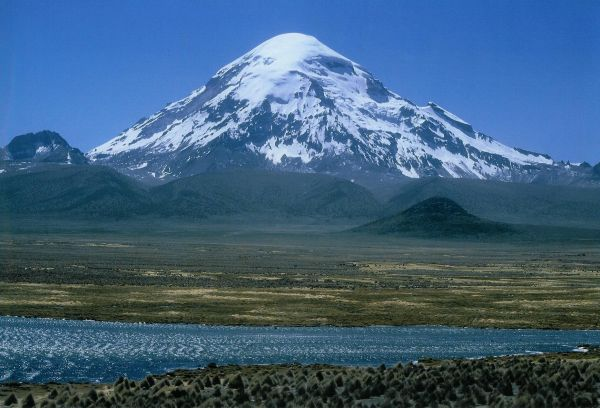
6,542 meter high Nevado Sajama is one of several volcanoes along Cordillera Occidental

The Andes of Bolivia began to rise about 200 million years ago (mya) during the Jurassic. The western margin of what is now South America had been the place of several other orogenies before the Andes rose. It has been hypothesized that the central Andes gained its great height 26 to 14 mya as result of a compressive failure of the lithosphere beneath Bolivia and neighboring areas. The great heights of the Altiplano, Codillera Occidental and Cordillera Oriental are isostatically compensated by an up to 70 km deep crust. Climate has responded to the formation of this important topographic barrier. It is not clear, however, if the rise of the Andes simply caused the extreme aridity of Atacama Desert and adjacent parts of Bolivia or if a preexisting desert climate and associated low erosion rates allowed the mountains to build up to their current heights. A hypothesis holds that scarce sediment supply to the Atacama Trench caused by arid climate induced high shear stresses in the subduction process that enhanced the Andean mountain building.

=== Western Cordillera ===
The Western Cordillera is made up by a series of active and extinct volcanoes rising from the western edge of the Altiplano plateau. This range divides the Chilean watersheds of Salar de Atacama and the Pacific from the endorheic Altiplano basin. The western volcanoes of Bolivia are part of the Central Volcanic Zone of the Andes, a major upper Cenozoic volcanic province. Volcanic eruptions in Bolivia are scarce, the latest one occurred in Irruputuncu in 1995. Volcanic hazards do not represent any threat to the major populated centres which are all in the eastern Altiplano or further east, far away from the volcanic centers. Although the Western Cordillera concentrates most active volcanoes (volcanoes active in the last 10000 years) many old large stratovolcanoes rises up to 100 km away from the main line of the Western Cordillera.

=== Altiplano plateau ===
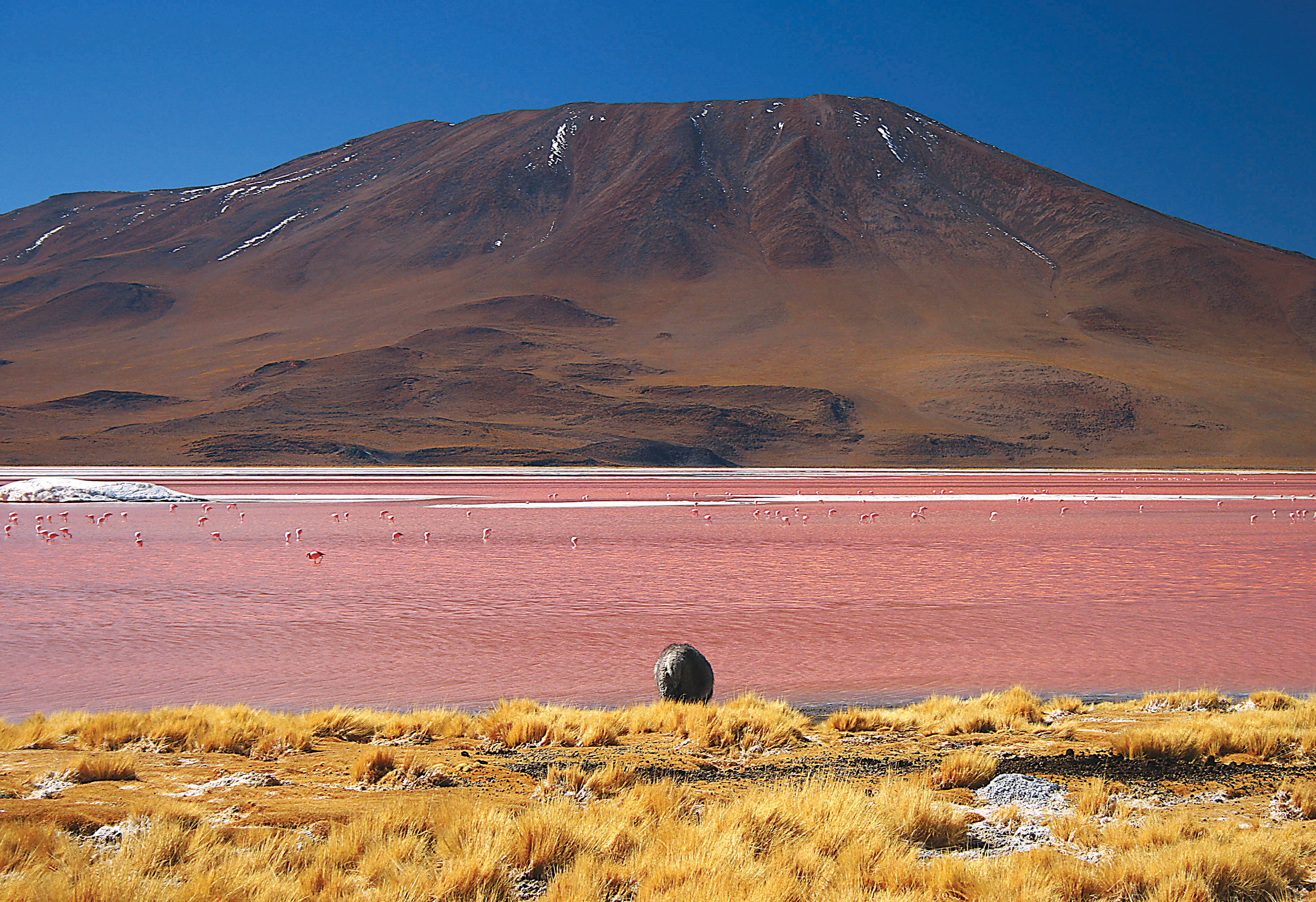
Laguna Colorada in the southern Altiplano lies just east of Cordillera Occidental's volcanoes (background mountain).

The Altiplano plateau or Meseta del Collasuyu to differentiate it from other Andean high plateaux is a wide and long-lived intermontane sedimentary basin with no outlet; it is endorheic. The Altiplano is an infill of sedimentary material from both Cordillera Occidental and Cordillera Oriental. The origin of the Altiplano and its great height has long been major question among geologists. Today the Altiplano is believed to have been an early foreland basin of the "proto-Andes" that got uplifted by crustal shortening in the Late Miocene.

The Bolivian Altiplano hosts the world's largest reserves of lithium. These reserves are in the salt-saturated waters of Salar de Uyuni and Salar de Coipasa, neither of which are currently being commercially exploited for lithium. Salt is extracted from the saltars in minor amounts to be sold as table salt after being added iodine from Chile.

=== Eastern Cordillera ===
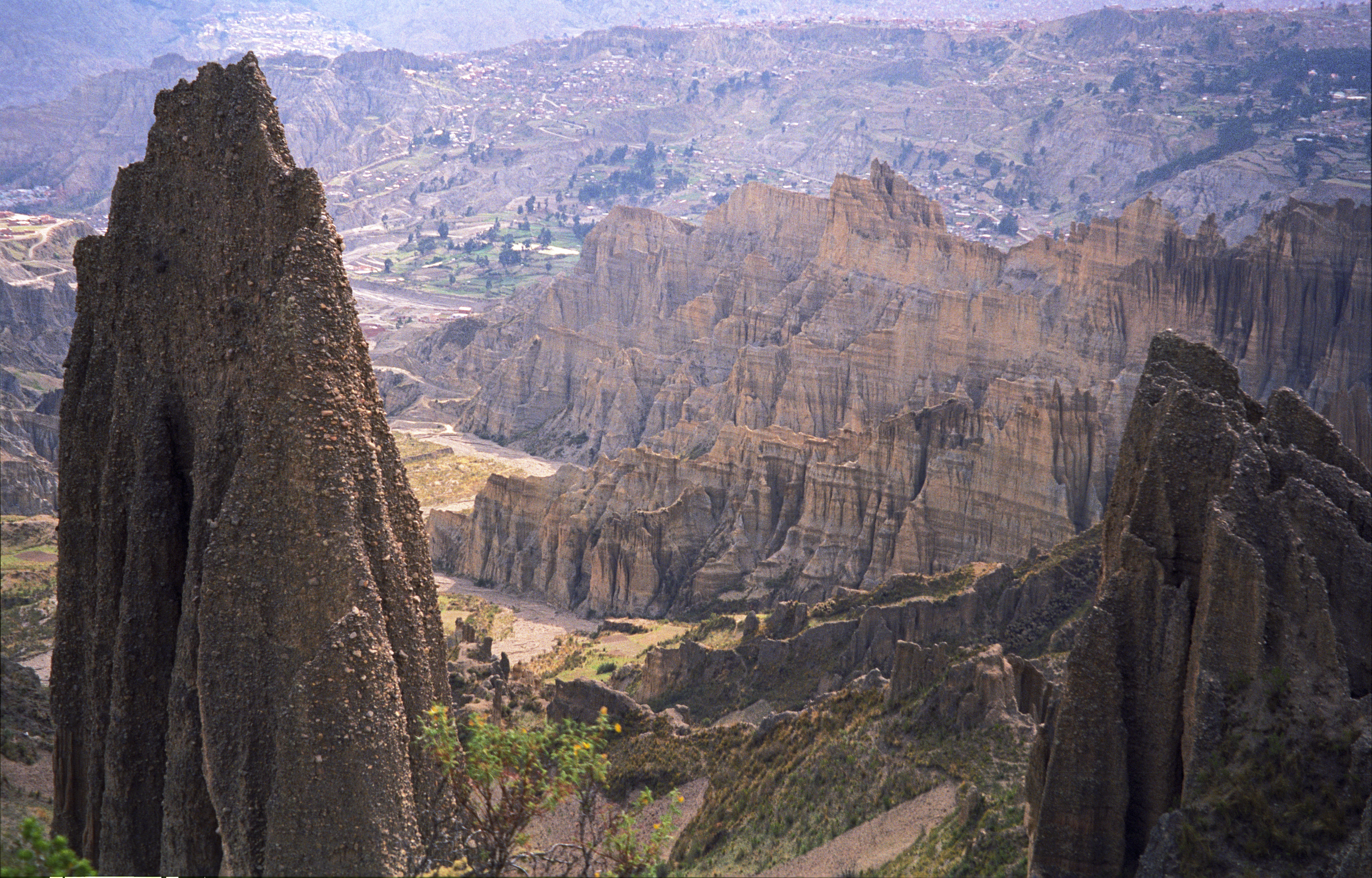
Erosion landscapes are common in the Central Cordillera and the Sub-Andean Zone

Cordillera Oriental is made up of a bended arc of plutons. The bend occurs at the latitude of Cochabamba and corresponds to eastward projection of the Arica elbow, the bend of South America's coastline at the Peru-Chile border. North of the bend Cordillera Central's batholiths are northwest–southeast oriented while south of it they are north–south oriented. These bodies of granitic to granodioritic composition were formed in two episodes: the Early Mesozoic (199–180 Ma) and the Neogene (19–8 Ma). The emplacement of these igneous bodies have been interpreted as an effect of two temporary decreases in subduction angles of the ancient Farallon Plate. This arc of magmatic material hosts Bolivia's widely known tin belt as well as the famous silver mine of Potosí. These mineralizations are of the porphyry mineralization type that are typical for convergent plate margins. The Cordillera Real form the northern, highly uplifted and eroded, part of the Central Cordillera.

== Lowlands and Sub-Andean zone ==
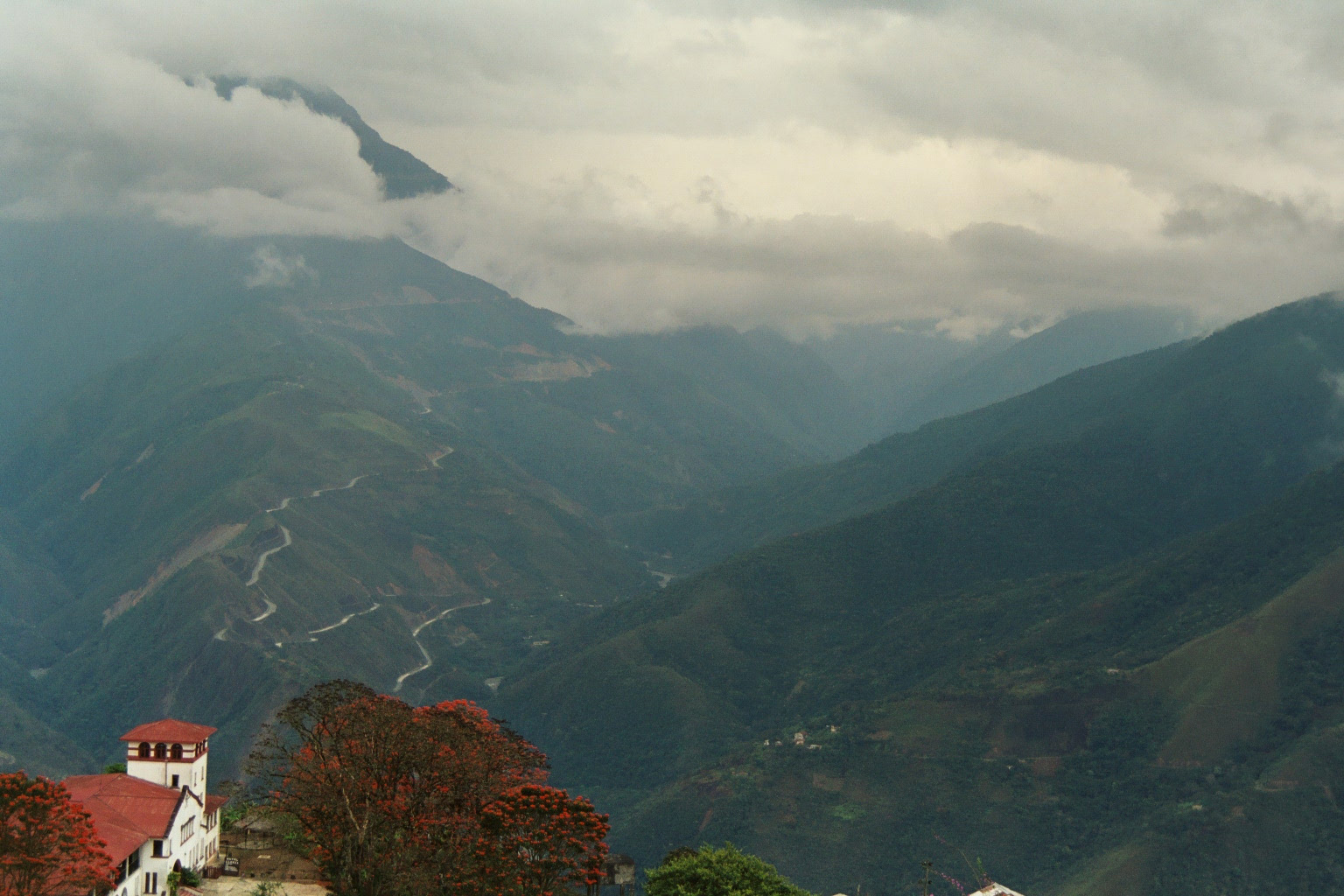
To reach the lowlands north of La Paz the Yungas-vegetated Cordillera Oriental has to be passed.

The Sub-Andean Zone and the Northern and Eastern Lowlands share a common ancient history but have since the Andean orogeny developed into two distinct zones. While both zones share essentially the same old sedimentary platform strata, the strata at the Sub-Andean Zone have been folded and thrusted into a fold and thrust belt with structural traps where hydrocarbon fluids have accumulated. The limit between the fold and thrust belt and the Eastern Lowlands is drawn by the Serranía del Aguaragüe, a north–south range representing the Andean thrust front.

=== Fold and thrust belt ===
The relatively low Cordillera Oriental, located east of Cordillera Central, are part of a fold and thrust belt and exposes Silurian and Ordovician age strata, some of which are fossil-bearing. The fold and thrust belt makes up the framework of the hydrographic network of Pilcomayo and other rivers. Currently one of Bolivia's most seismic zones is the Cochabamba Fault Zone, located just below the city of Cochabamba and its fertile valley. This fault zone is related to the Arica elbow and the bend in the Andes at this latitude.

=== Eastern Lowlands ===
The geology of the eastern lowlands is dominated by the ancient Paleozoic sedimentary Chaco–Tarija Basin that has considerable hydrocarbon reserves. During the Carboniferous, the Chaco-Tarija Basin was covered by thick sequences that included sandstone filled channels. In the 1970s these sandstone were interpreted as tillite from the late Paleozoic glaciations, but new interpretations consider them to be of marine origin but still glacially influenced. The depositional environment for these channel systems has been likened to that on the floor of the present day Labrador Sea, which was influenced by repeated Pleistocene glaciations. The late Cenozoic deformation associated with the Andean orogeny forced hydrocarbons sourced in Devonian shales to migrate to shallower stratigraphical levels.

=== Northern Lowlands ===
The Northern Lowlands are and have long been a depositional milieu and are mostly covered by Tertiary and Quaternary deposits. The bulk of these deposits are now laterites. River erosion and sediment transport have created a large number of oxbow lakes and added copious meanders to the rivers.

== Guaporé Shield ==
In the north and east of Santa Cruz Department the crystalline Precambrian Guaporé Shield (also called Central Brazil Shield) makes up most of the bedrock but is mostly covered by Tertiary laterites and Quaternary alluvial basins. The shield expresses itself topographically as a large elevated hinterland located north of Serranías Chiquitanas towards the Brazilian border. High-grade metamorphic rocks occur in the Bolivian part of the Guaporé Shield partly due to the 2000 million years old "Trans-Amazonian tectonothermal event" that affected parts of South America. Low-grade metamorphic rocks occur as well. The Guaporé Shield is believed to extend beneath the Phanerozoic Tarija-Chaco and Beni Basin sediments into the Andes. The East-West Río Mercedes Line in the Guaporé Shield hosts several Proterozoic diabase intrusions. As of 1985 the rocks of Guaporé Shield were considered to be poorly known. Near the Brazilian border the iron deposit of El Mutún stands out as the world's largest iron ore deposit. It is located in the Serranía de El Mutún, also called Cerro Mutún or Serranía de Jacadigo in Brazil. The shield also underlies Serrania Caparuch or Huanchaca which is the inspiration for the Lost World of Conan Doyle.

Proyecto Precámbrico, an Anglo-Bolivian technical cooperation project, explored the area between 1976 and 1986. There are a series of published 1:250,000 scale maps of the area with accompanying bilingual reports, along with more detailed 1:100,000 maps of regions of economic interest. There is a published geochemical atlas. Most of this data is summarised in an "Overseas Memoir" of the British Geological Survey.

== See also ==
- List of volcanoes in Bolivia
- Natural gas in Bolivia
- Potosí
- San Cristóbal mine (Bolivia)
- Siglo XX mine
