= El Mutún =

Iron ore deposit in Santa Cruz, Bolivia

Coordinates: 19°11′25″S 57°53′02″W

El Cerro Mutún (Spanish for "the Mountain Mutún") is an iron ore deposit. Located in the Germán Busch Province in the Santa Cruz Department of Bolivia, near Puerto Suárez, it extends across the border into Brazil, where it is called the Serrania de Jacadigo. Also known as the "Serrania Mutún", it has an area of about 75 square kilometers. Its estimated reserves are about 40.205 billion tons of iron ore of 50% iron, mainly in hematite and magnetite form, and in lesser quantities in siderite and manganese minerals. This can be compared with an estimate of the total world reserves of iron ore: 800 billion tons of crude ore containing more than 230 billion tons of iron.

== Iron ore mining ==
A series of attempts have been made to commercially extract the iron ore on the site, including by the Brazilian firm EBX and the Indian company Jindal Steel. Following Jindal's 2012 exit from the country, the Mutún Steel Company (Spanish: Empresa Siderúrgica del Mutún)—the state-owned partner in the previous ventures—continues to plan for operations.

=== EBX foundry ===
In early 2000s, Brazilian company EBX devised a project to create a foundry in El Mutún. However, the project was blocked by Bolivian president Evo Morales because of environmental concerns; instead of using natural gas available from a pipeline 20 km away, vegetable carbon was to be used for the foundry, demanding 45 hectares a day of Amazonian wood. Despite this, EBX started working anyway before obtaining its licence, under the name of MXX. The Bolivian Ministry of Defence declared that "various irregularities and constitutional violations" had been observed. On April 19, 2006, the Bolivian army freed three government ministers who had been taken hostage by villagers demanding the immediate opening of all EBX's installations. By 2007, the Bolivian government had expelled EBX from the Mutún region.

=== Jindal Steel ===
In 2007, India's third largest steel manufacturer, Jindal Steel and Power Limited, signed a contract with the Bolivian government to exploit the El Mutún iron ore deposit. According to the contract, Jindal would invest US$1.5 billion initially and an additional US$2.5 billion over the next eight years. This is the single largest investment by an Indian firm in Latin America. By September 2011, Jindal had obtained clearance for the project from the EIA and had hired an engineering consultant for FEED work. The project was expected to create 6,000 jobs directly and another 15,000 indirectly.

Jindal Steel planned to set up an integrated 1.7 MTPA steel plant, a 6 MTPA sponge iron plant, a 10 MTPA iron ore pellet plant and a 450 MW power plant. The project was expected to generate US$200 million in revenues for the Bolivian government, equivalent to 5% of its current revenue. The government projected that the Jindal complex would generate more than 21,000 jobs. As of 2009, Jindal had only invested US$20 million on the Mutún project due to difficulty in securing natural gas supplies from the Bolivian government for the 450MW power plant and ore smelting process. With progress on the project stalled, the Bolivian government and Jindal steel traded both accusations and demands. The government had opened criminal investigations against Jindal's executives and demanded that the full promised investment be deposited in Bolivian banks, while the company demanded these charges be dropped in exchange for a $18 million investment. Jindal announced its decision to withdraw on July 16, 2012. In August 2012 Jindal finally exited the El Mutún project. In 2014, international arbitrators awarded Jindal $22.5 million due to Bolivia's earlier seizure of the bond.

An editorial in La Jornada alleged that contrary to contract terms, Jindal was mostly interested in extracting iron ore concentrates and exporting the raw material for further processing at its plants in India.

== See also ==
- El Mutún mine
- Geology of Bolivia
