= Cochabamba Fault Zone =

Fault zone in the Bolivian Andes

The Cochabamba Fault Zone or Cochabamba Shear Zone (Spanish: Zona de falla de Cochabamba) is an east-southeast trending zone of sinistral strike-slip faults near the city of Cochabamba in the Bolivian Andes. The movements along Cochabamba Fault Zone are related to the bend in the Andes from running in a north-west direction to a north–south direction at this latitude. The compression of the crust at the Arica Elbow causes part of the thrust belt in the Bolivian Andes to acquire a lateral movement to escape from the compression taking place along the elbow axis.

== See also ==
- Atacama Fault
- Geology of Bolivia
