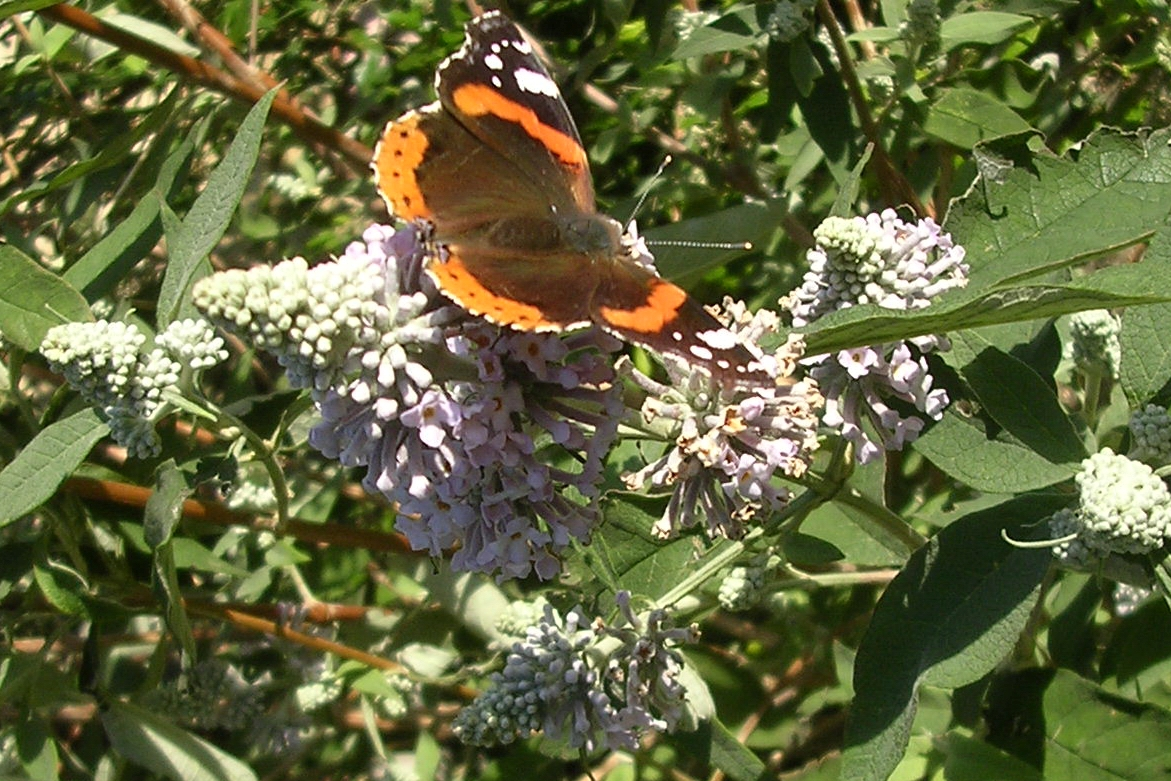
- B. officinalis with red admiral in January, UK.

Scientific classification
- Kingdom: Plantae
- Clade: Tracheophytes
- Clade: Angiosperms
- Clade: Eudicots
- Clade: Asterids
- Order: Lamiales
- Family: Scrophulariaceae
- Genus: Buddleja
- Species: B. officinalis

Binomial name
- Buddleja officinalis Maxim.

Synonyms
- Buddleja officinalis var. macrantha Lingelsh.

= Buddleja officinalis =

Species of plant

Buddleja officinalis is a deciduous early-spring flowering shrub native to west Hubei, Sichuan, and Yunnan provinces in China. Discovered in 1875 by Pavel Piasetski, a surgeon in the Russian army, B. officinalis was named and described by Maximowicz in 1880. Introduced to western cultivation in 1908, B. officinalis was accorded the Royal Horticultural Society's Award of Merit three years later, and the Award of Garden Merit (record 689) in 2002.

== Description ==
Buddleja officinalis largely resembles the commoner B. davidii in shape and size, growing to less than 2.5 m in height. The inflorescences are honey-scented mauve panicles, shorter (under 8 cm) than those of davidii, and more conical. The leaves are lanceolate, under 15 cm long, softly pubescent, the upper surface rich green in colour, the underside grey. 2n = 38.

== Cultivation ==
Buddleja officinalis is not fully frost hardy, unable to survive temperatures lower than −10° C, and is best grown against a south-facing wall. The shrub should be cut back hard each year immediately after flowering in spring. Propagation by softwood cuttings is easily accomplished, using vermiculite as a rooting medium.

In the UK the shrub is often grown as a nectar source for vanessid butterflies such as the peacock on emergence from hibernation. Hardiness: RHS H2, USDA zones 8 – 9. One notable cultivar of B. officinalis is Buddleja 'Winter Sun'.
