= Buddleja 'Winter Sun' =

Flowering plant cultivar

Buddleja hybrid
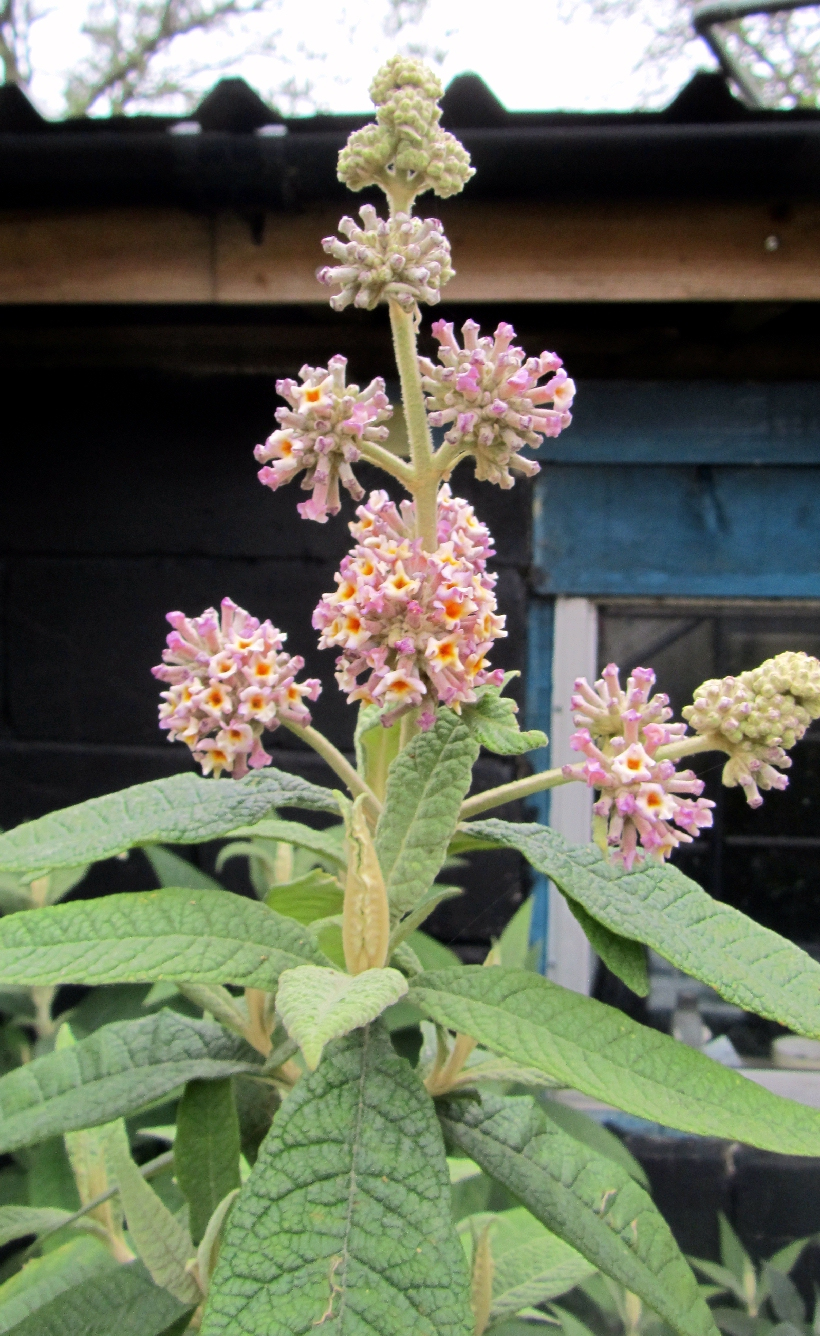
- Inflorescence of Buddleja 'Winter Sun'.
- Cultivar: 'Winter Sun'
- Origin: London, UK

Buddleja 'Winter Sun' is a British cultivar raised by Steve Nevard, London, from a crossing of B. araucana (formerly B. nappei) and B. officinalis. 'Winter Sun' is a winter / early spring flowering shrub of similar size and vigour to B. officinalis. It has pink-flushed-yellow flowers in terminal clusters of small globose heads, complemented by olive green foliage with a brown tomentose underside.

'Winter Sun' is uncommon. It is not known to be in cultivation beyond the UK. A specimen is grown as part of the NCCPG national buddleja collection held by Longstock Park Nursery near Stockbridge.
