= Serranías Chiquitanas =

- Location within Bolivia

Highest point
- Coordinates: 18°06′S 60°02′W

Geography
- Country: Bolivia
- Region: Santa Cruz Department

Geology
- Rock age: Precambrian
- Rock types: Gneiss and Granitoid

The Serranías Chiquitanas are a group of low mountain ranges in the northeast of the Bolivian department of Santa Cruz. The ranges are located at the southern periphery of the discrete massif of the Guaporé shield. The Serranías Chiquitanas stands out of the surrounding lowlands as a series of forested hills some of which have escarpments. The Serranías Chiquitanas runs in a northwest to southeast fashion. The most important ranges among the Serranías are Serranía de Santiago, Serranía de San José, Serranía de Sunsas and Sierra de Chochis.
