= Murillo Lake =

Lake in Bolivia

- Location within Bolivia Location within South America
- Interactive map of Murillo Lake
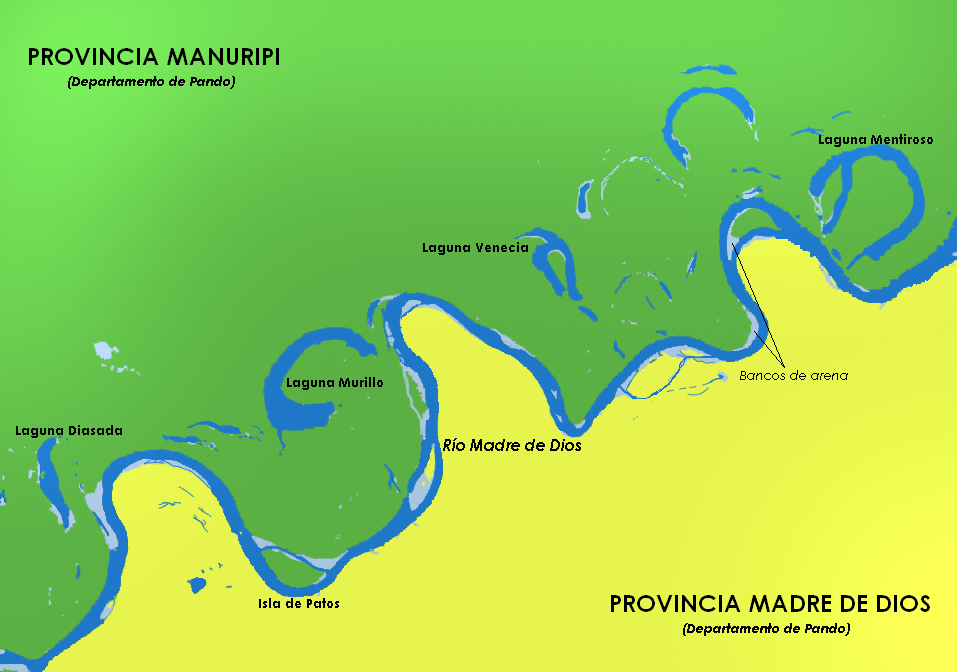
- Location: Manuripi Province, Pando Department
- Coordinates: 11°11′S 66°51′W
- Basin countries: Bolivia
- Surface area: 7.6 km^{2} (2.9 sq mi)
- Surface elevation: 140 m (460 ft)

Murillo Lake is a lake in the Manuripi Province, Pando Department, Bolivia. At an elevation of 140 m, its surface area is 7.6 km^{2} (3 sq mi).
