= Cordillera Oriental (Bolivia) =

Mountain range in Bolivia

Coordinates: 17°19′S 66°07′W

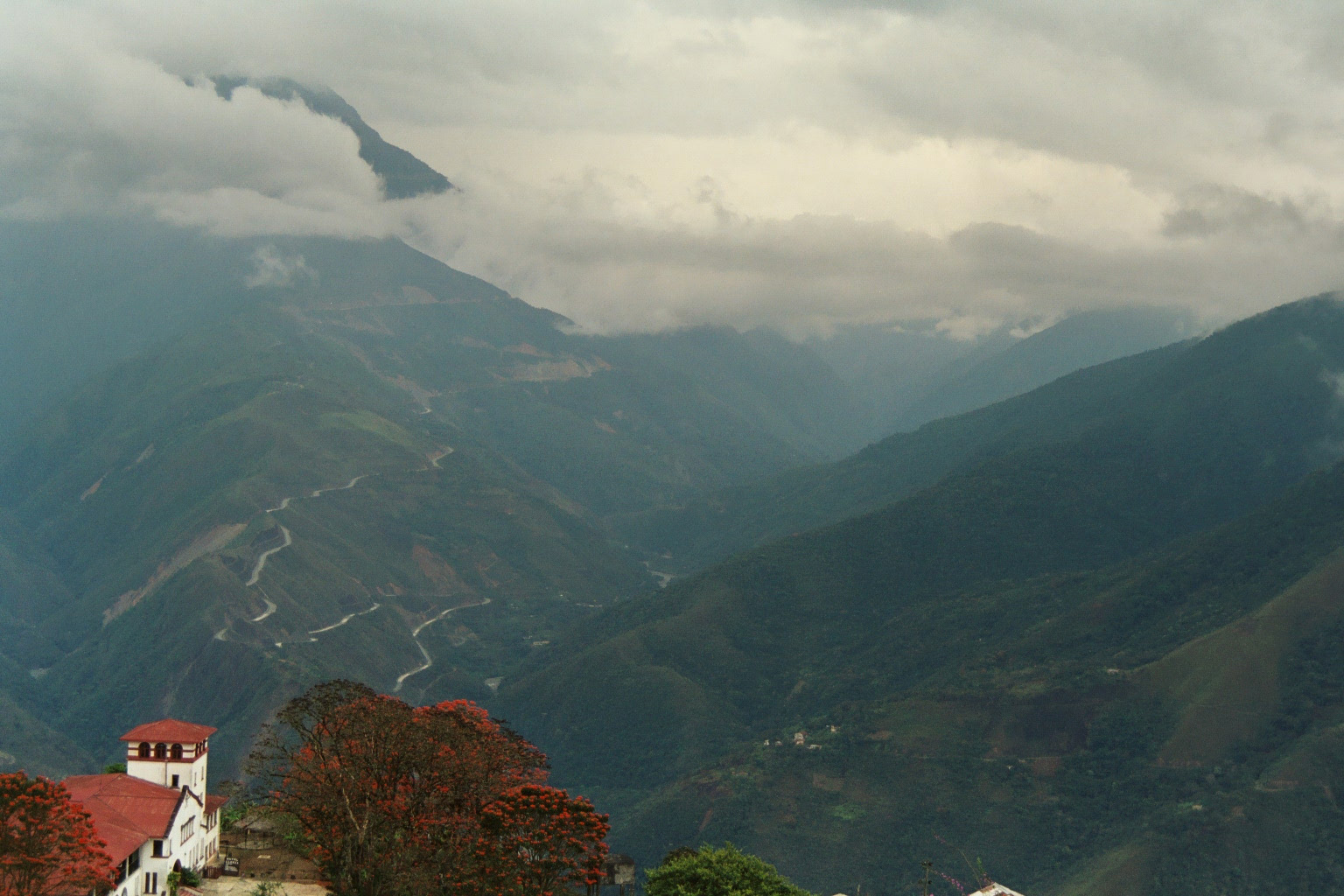
The Yungas of Coroico.

The Cordillera Oriental or Eastern Cordillera is a set of parallel mountain ranges of the Bolivian Andes, emplaced on the eastern and north eastern margin of the Andes. Large parts of Cordillera Oriental are forested and humid areas rich in agricultural and livestock products. Geologically, the Cordillera Oriental is formed by the Central Andean fold and thrust belt.

The Bolivian tin belt lies in the cordillera.

== Division ==
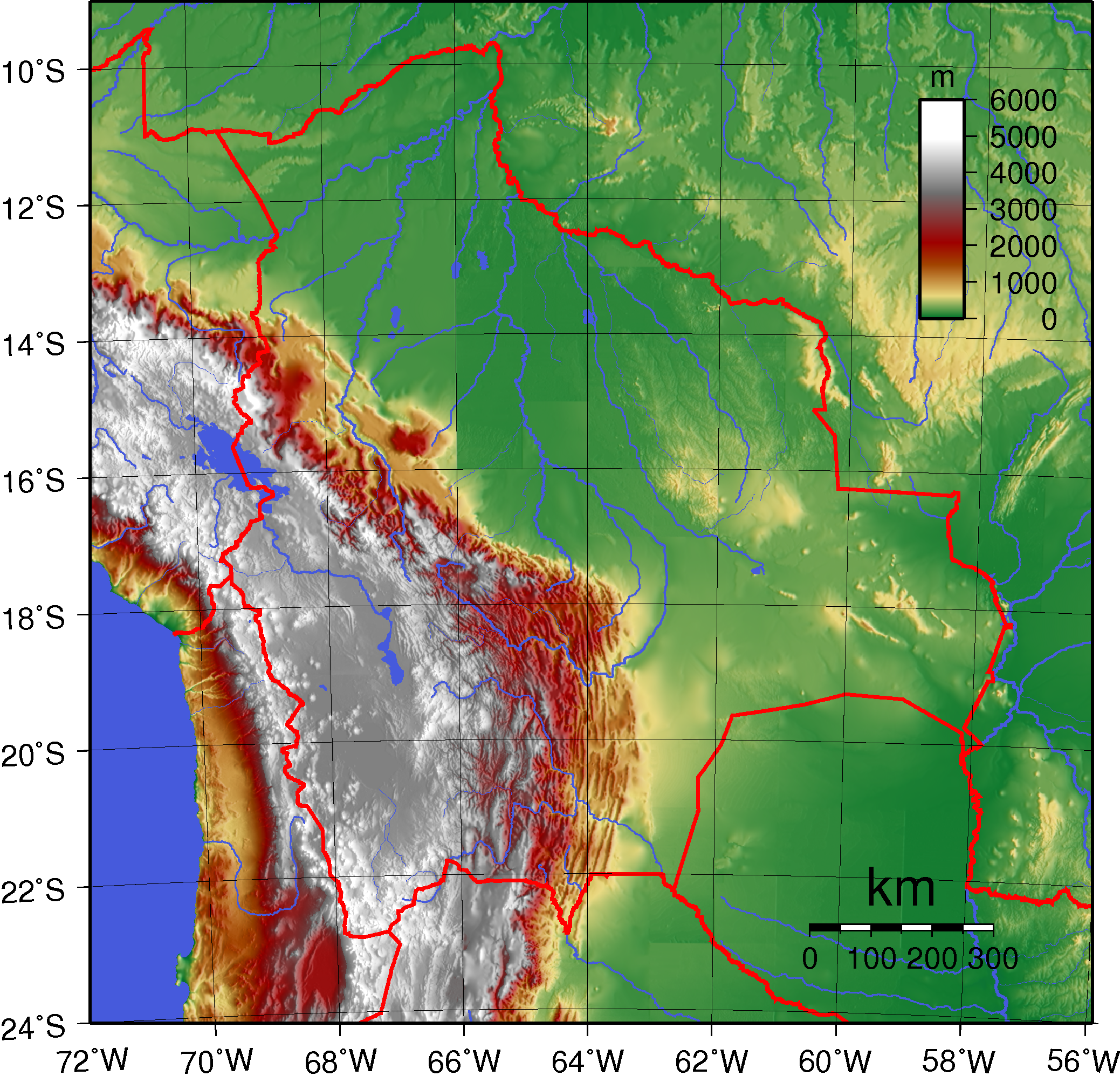
Topographic map of Bolivia showing (east to west) plains of Amazon Basin in green, Sub-Andean Zone in red, Eastern Cordillera in white, Altiplano in gray, and Western Cordillera in white

The cordillera can be divided into three sections in Bolivia and one in northwestern Argentina:

- The northern section is a continuous mountain range like Eslabón, San Buenaventura, Muchane, Pilón, etc. and between its important summits you can find Astalaya and Cerro Colorado.
- The central section was formed entirely by the Cochabamba mountain range, this section crossing the department of Cochabamba forms the Yungas and the Chapare. Its major summits include Tunari at approximately 5,200 meters and San Benito with 4,298 meters. It extends from the department of Santa Cruz, forming the isolated mountain ranges like Mataracu, San Rafael, Las Juntas, Los Volcanes, these all ending in Amboró National Park.
- The southern section starts north of Chuquisaca with the Presto mountain range and ending in the Caiza and Capirenda mountain ranges in Gran Chaco province in the department of Tarija. The easternmost range of the southern section and the Bolivian Andes is Serranía del Aguaragüe. The southern section does not contain representative summits.
- The Cordillera Oriental extends into Argentina, where it is found from north to south in the provinces of Jujuy, Salta and the northern part of Tucumán Province.

== See also ==
- Cordillera Central (Bolivia)
- Cordillera Occidental (Central Andes)
