= Cordillera Central (Bolivia) =

Mountain range in Bolivia

Coordinates: 18°30′S 64°55′W

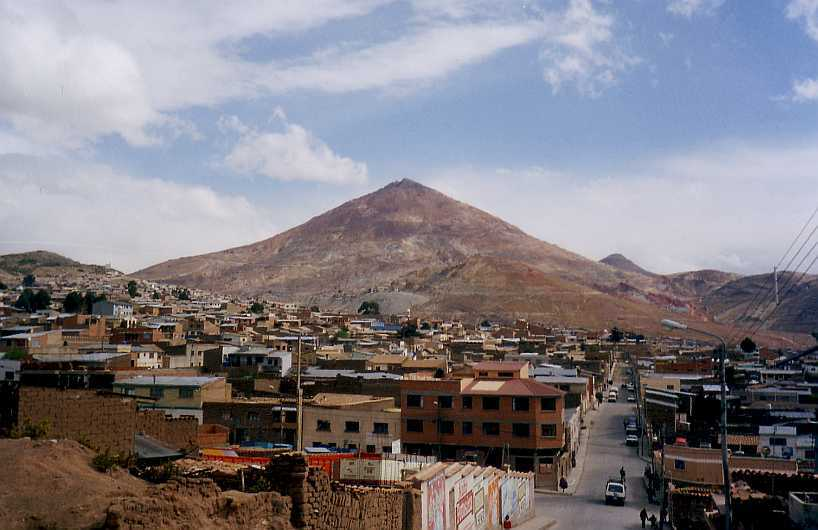
A view of Potosí with the mountain Sumaq Urqu (also P'utuqsi Urqu or Cerro Rico) in the background

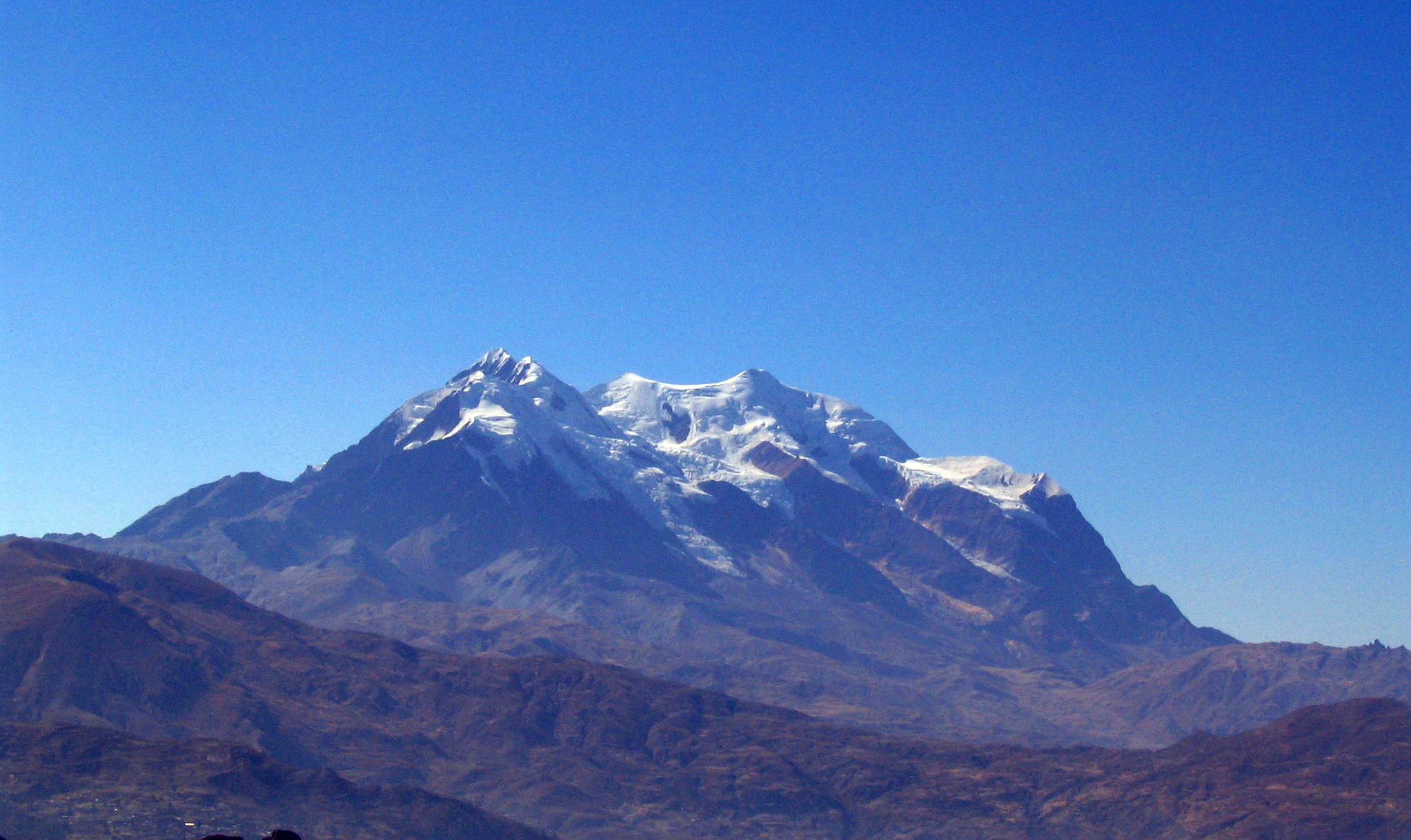
Illimani

The Cordillera Central is a Bolivian mountain range that divides the three river basins in the country and also has the second highest peaks in Bolivia. It is rich in minerals and starts in the north with Chawpi Urqu and the three Palumanis that were in the south up to Zapaleri, forming a border with Chile and Argentina. The Cordillera Central is divided into three sections:

- The northern section or Cordillera Real, with Chawpi Urqu and Palumani, La Paz, Illimani, Illampu, Janq'u Uma, Mururata, and Huayna Potosí, with the latter six all being more than 6,000 meters high. This section is famous because the highest meteorological observatory in the world can be found on Chacaltaya. Some of the highest ski slopes in the world can be found here also.
- The central section contains Sumaq Urqu, with the Potosí mountain range and the Paso de Condor rail station, both situated at an elevation of 4,288 meters.
- The southern section is characterized by its high rate of mineralization and large deposits of tin. Its highest summit is Zapaleri on the border with Chile and Argentina.

The Cordillera Central lies between the Cordillera Occidental and Cordillera Oriental.
