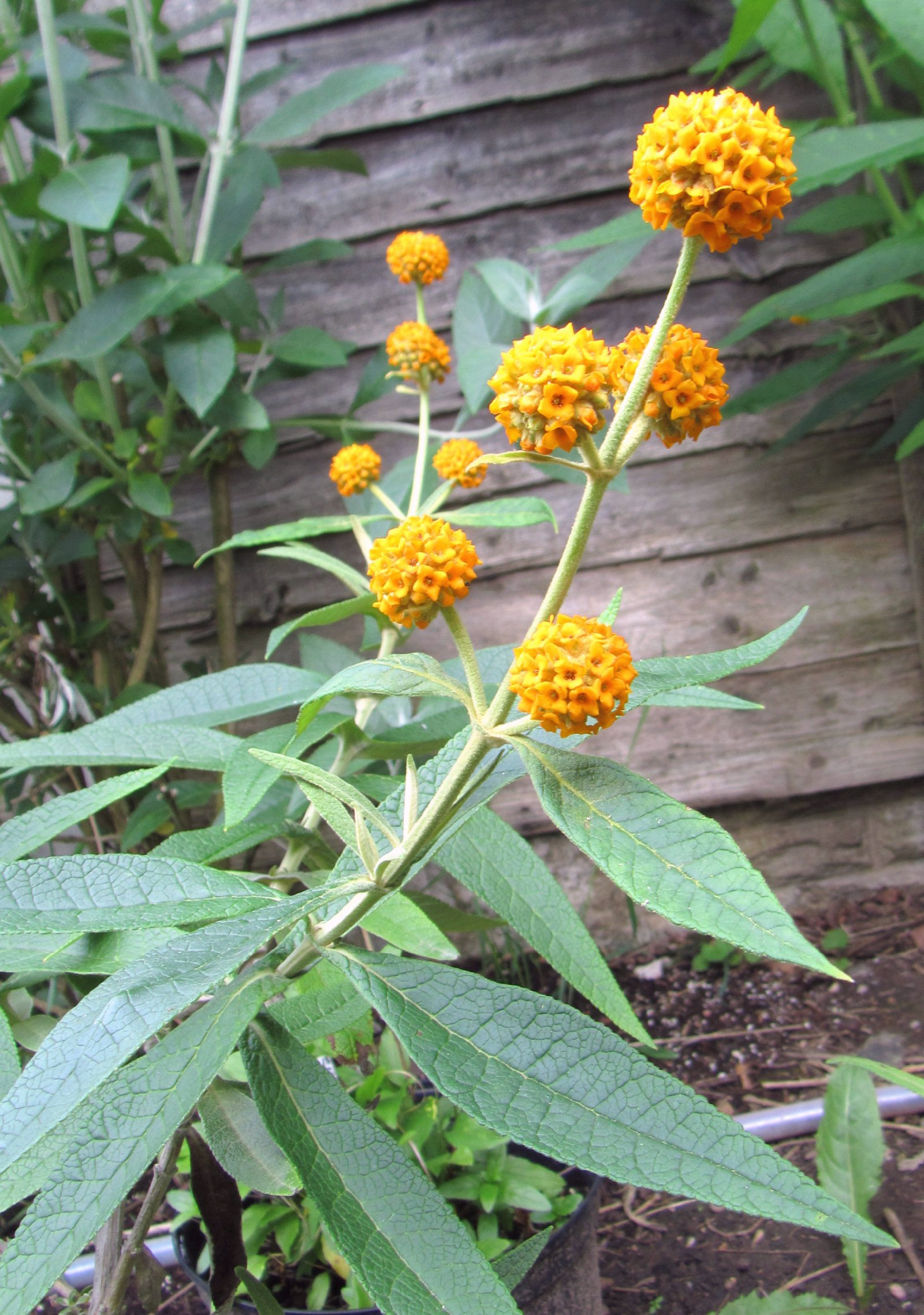

Scientific classification
- Kingdom: Plantae
- Clade: Tracheophytes
- Clade: Angiosperms
- Clade: Eudicots
- Clade: Asterids
- Order: Lamiales
- Family: Scrophulariaceae
- Genus: Buddleja
- Species: B. araucana

Binomial name
- Buddleja araucana Phil.

Synonyms
- Buddleja globosa var. araucana (Phil.) Reiche; Buddleja nappii Lorentz, 1881

= Buddleja araucana =

Species of flowering plant

Buddleja araucana is endemic to the semi-deserts and steppes of Patagonia, from southern Mendoza to Río Negro and Neuquen provinces in Argentina, and adjacent Chile. The species was first described and named by Philippi in 1873, it was introduced to cultivation by the British gardener and plant collector Harold Comber as a form B. globosa in 1925.

== Description ==
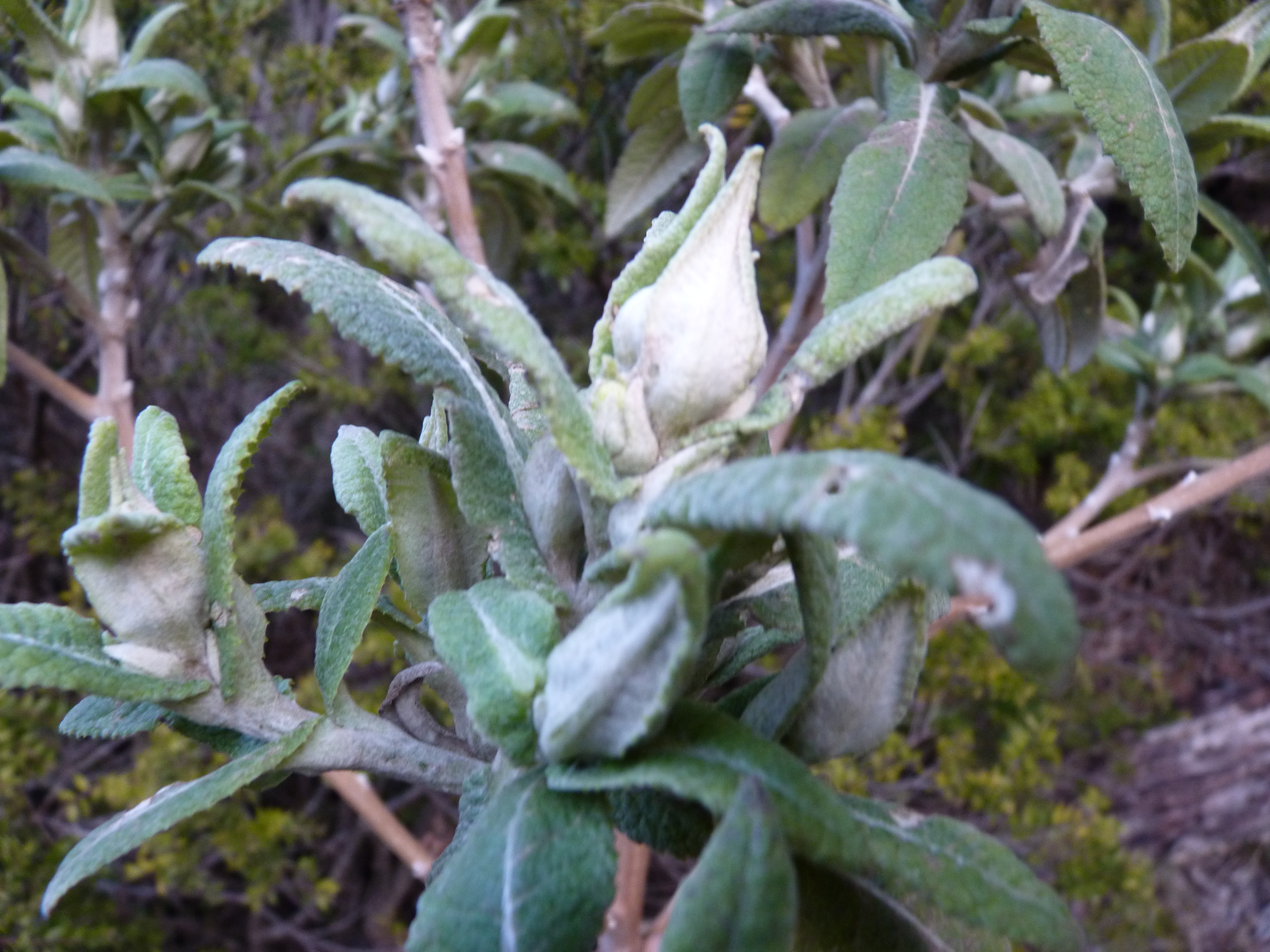

B. araucana is a dioecious shrub, 1–3 m tall, with grey fissured bark. The young branches are terete and tomentose, bearing sessile coriaceous leaves linear to lanceolate tomentose on both sides, 3–9 cm long by 0.8–1.8 cm wide. The light orange inflorescence comprises one terminal globose head and 1–5 pairs of pedunculate heads in the axils of the progressively larger leaves; the heads are 1–2 cm in diameter and contain 25–45 flowers, the corolla is tomentulose, 4–5 mm long, with warty hairs inside. Ploidy: 2n = 38.

The species is easily confused with B. globosa, but the latter has larger, more glabrous leaves, and larger flowerheads comprising more flowers.

== Cultivation ==
The shrub has proved hardy in the UK, where it has survived at Kew since 1927. It is also cultivated at the RBG Edinburgh, and as part of the NCCPG National Buddleja Collections at Longstock Park Nursery and The Lavender Garden, where it is still known (2012) by its old taxon B. nappii. Hardiness: USDA zones 7–9. One notable cultivar of B. araucana is Buddleja 'Winter Sun'.
