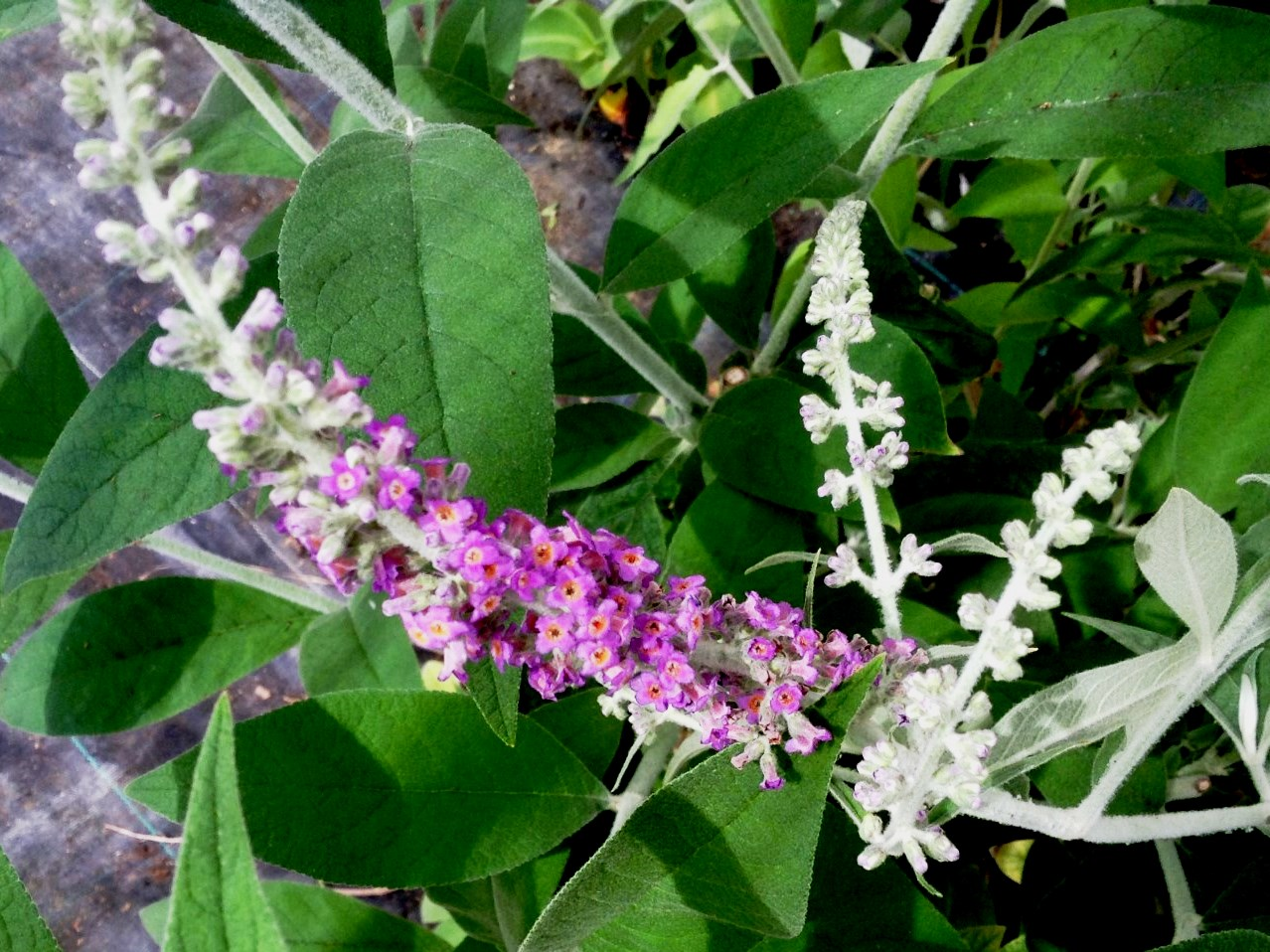

Scientific classification
- Kingdom: Plantae
- Clade: Tracheophytes
- Clade: Angiosperms
- Clade: Eudicots
- Clade: Asterids
- Order: Lamiales
- Family: Scrophulariaceae
- Genus: Buddleja
- Species: B. stenostachya

Binomial name
- Buddleja stenostachya Rehder & E. H. Wilson

= Buddleja stenostachya =

Species of plant

Buddleja stenostachya is a deciduous shrub native to the province of Sichuan, China. The species was discovered and introduced to cultivation by Wilson in 1908, and named by him and Rehder in 1913. There remains some contention over its taxonomy; it was sunk under B. nivea by Leeuwenberg; while another erroneously sank it as a variety of Buddleja crispa.

== Description ==
Buddleja stenostachya can grow to 3 m in height, its shoots covered by a dense white indumentum. The oblong-lanceolate leaves are of variable size, < 20 cm long by 6 cm wide; they are long pointed, tapered at the base, with only slightly toothed or occasionally entire margins. The upper surfaces are dull green in colour, the undersides, like the shoots, covered in a dense white wool. The inflorescences are slender panicles < 45 cm long, comprising closely packed, short stalked cymes with few small flowers, lilac in colour with orange throat, and covered with down. The panicles usually appear in threes at the end of the current season's growth in late summer and autumn. Ploidy: B. stenostachya is hexaploid (2n=114) like B. nivea.

== Cultivation ==
The species is uncommon in cultivation in the UK and North America. In the UK, specimens are grown as part of the NCCPG National Collection held by Longstock Park Nursery near Stockbridge, Hampshire, at the Sir Harold Hillier Gardens, near Romsey, and at the Savill Garden in Surrey. The shrub should be pruned in spring to maintain shape.

== Suppliers ==
Buddleja stenostachya is in commerce in the UK; vendors can be found in the RHS's Plantfinder.

== Literature ==
- Brown, R. (ex C. Martius). (1996). Loganiceae, in Wu, Z. & Raven, P. (eds) Flora of China, Vol. 15. Science Press, Beijing, and Missouri Botanical Garden Press, St. Louis, USA. ISBN 978-0-915279-37-1 vol. 15 (1996): online at www.efloras.org
- Leeuwenberg, A. J. M. (1979) The Loganiaceae of Africa XVIII Buddleja L. II, Revision of the African & Asiatic species. H. Veenman & Zonen B. V., Wageningen, Netherlands.
