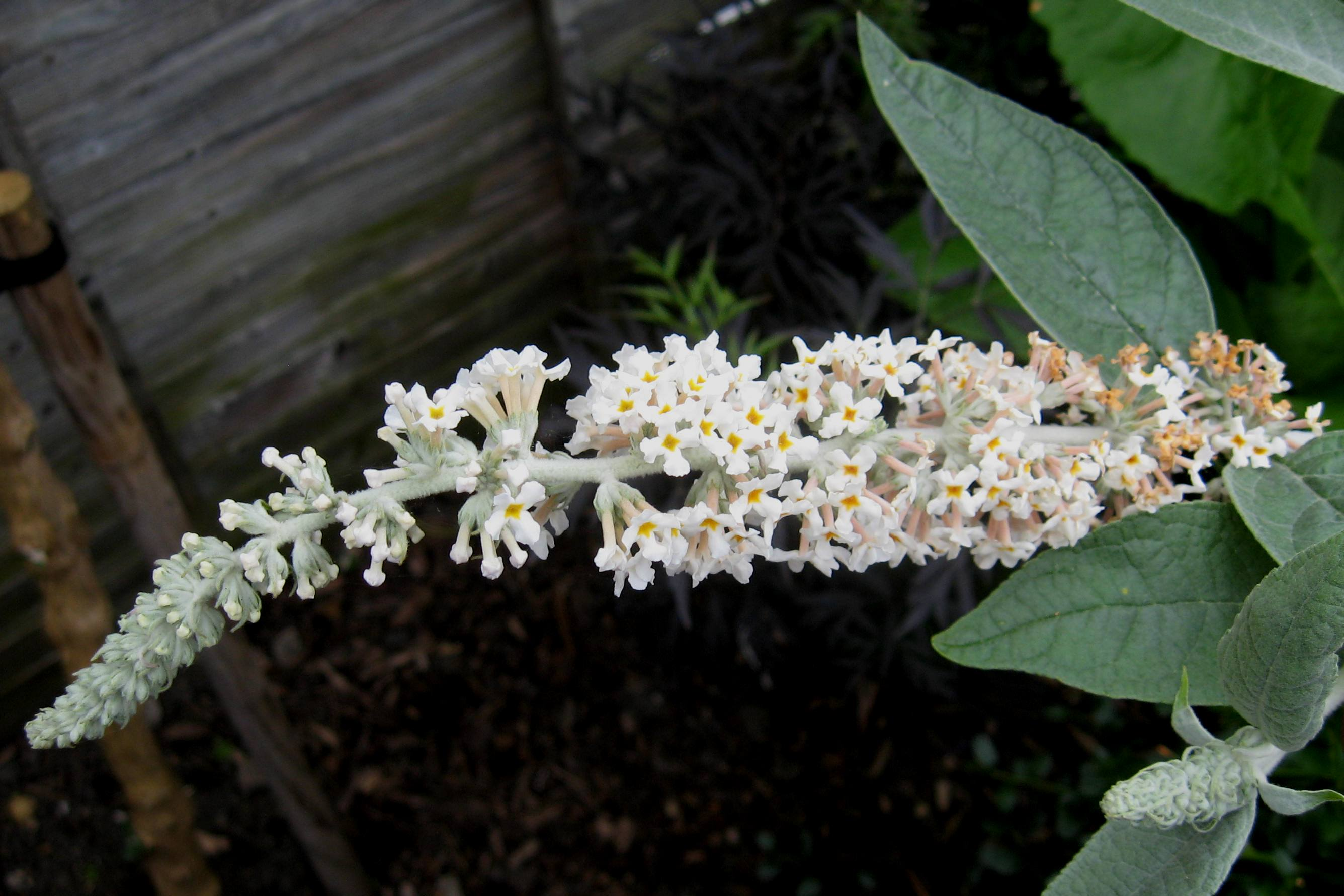

Scientific classification
- Kingdom: Plantae
- Clade: Embryophytes
- Clade: Tracheophytes
- Clade: Spermatophytes
- Clade: Angiosperms
- Clade: Eudicots
- Clade: Asterids
- Order: Lamiales
- Family: Scrophulariaceae
- Genus: Buddleja
- Species: B. fallowiana
- Variety: B. f. var. alba

Trinomial name
- Buddleja fallowiana var. alba Sabourin

Synonyms
- Buddleja fallowiana Balf. f. & W. W. Sm.; Buddleja fallowiana 'Sabourin' in error

= Buddleja fallowiana var. alba =

Variety of plant

Buddleja fallowiana var. alba Sabourin is a white-flowered variety of B. fallowiana endemic to Yunnan in western China, where it grows in open woodland, along forest edges and watercourses. The shrub was considered superior to the lavender-blue flowered B. fallowiana by Bean, who thought it one of the most attractive of all buddlejas.

Introduced to cultivation as seed sent to England in 1925 by Forrest, the variety was named by Sabourin. However its status was challenged by Leeuwenberg, who considered its different flower colour and smaller size insufficient to justify its distinction as a variety, and sank it as simply B. fallowiana.

Accorded the Royal Horticultural Society Award of Garden Merit (record 686) in 1993 (reaffirmed 2010); the shrub also came second (after 'Sungold') in the public poll of 57 Buddleja species and cultivars conducted by the University of Georgia in 1997.

== Description ==
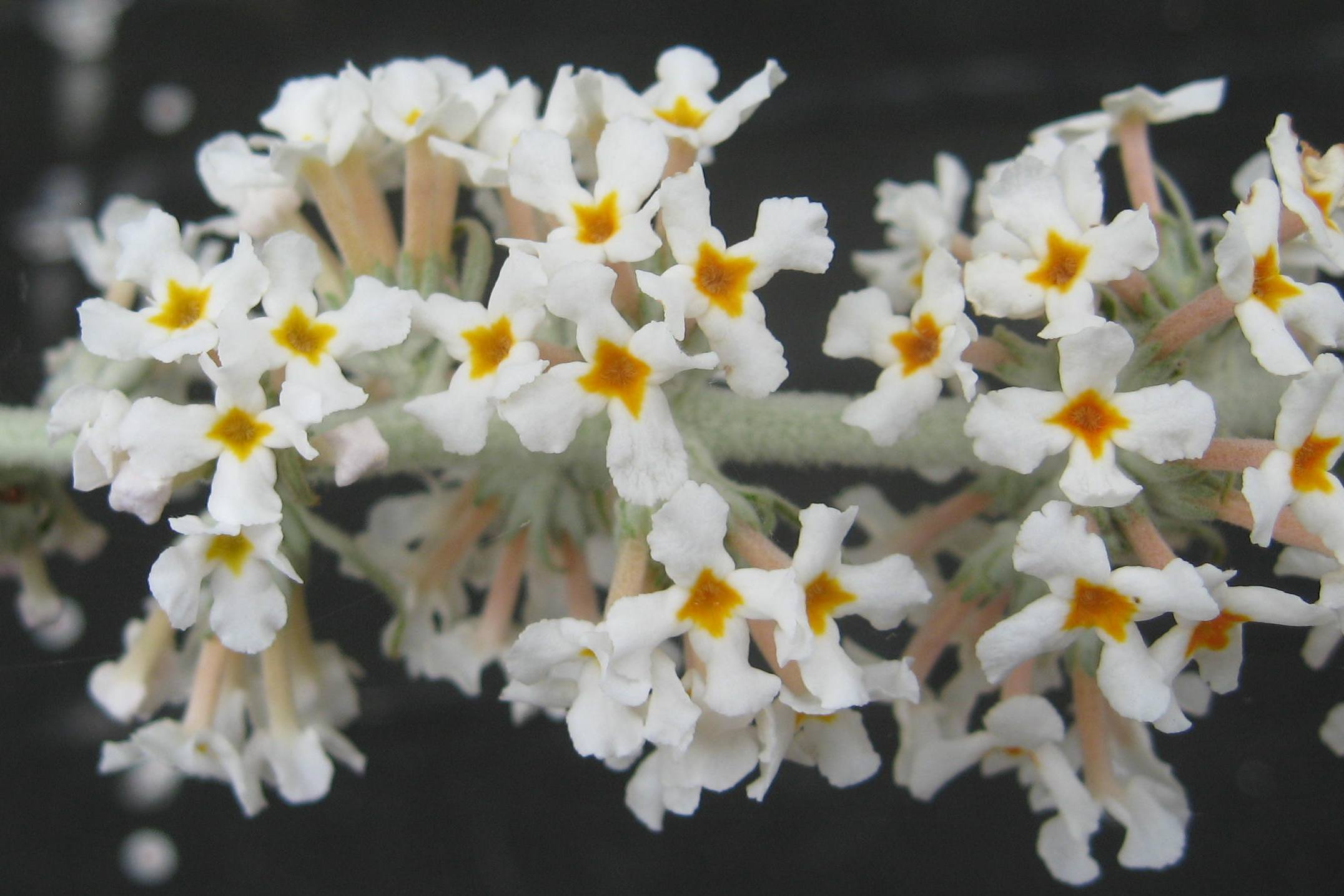

Buddleja fallowiana var. alba is a deciduous, comparatively slow-growing shrub of loose habit, typically growing to a height and width of < 1.7 × 2 m. The young shoots are clothed with a dense white felt. The leaves are lanceolate, tapering to a fine point, with shallowly toothed margins. The size of the leaves varies considerably according to the vigour of the shoot, and can reach 25 cm long by 8 cm wide, the upper surfaces glabrescent and dark-green, the lower surfaces densely tomentose. The inflorescences are lax narrow panicles < 25 cm long by 2.5 – 3 cm wide, and comprise vanilla-scented white flowers with yellow eyes, the corollas 10 mm long. The flowers bloom in late summer and autumn. Ploidy: 2n = 76 (tetraploid).

== Cultivation ==
Somewhat tender, var. alba is better grown against a wall. However, if cut to the ground by frost, it will grow again from the base. Growth is significantly slower than that of B. davidii, Bean considering the species more closely allied to B. nivea. Hardiness: RHS H5, USDA zones 8–9.
