= Buddleja davidii var. superba =

Scientific classification
- Kingdom: Plantae
- Clade: Embryophytes
- Clade: Tracheophytes
- Clade: Spermatophytes
- Clade: Angiosperms
- Clade: Eudicots
- Clade: Asterids
- Order: Lamiales
- Family: Scrophulariaceae
- Genus: Buddleja
- Species: B. davidii
- Variety: B. d. var. superba

Trinomial name
- Buddleja davidii var. superba (de Corte) Rehder & E.H.Wilson

Variety of plants

Buddleja davidii var. superba is endemic to the Yunnan province of western China. The taxonomy of the plant and the other five davidii varieties has been challenged in recent years. Leeuwenberg sank them all as synonyms, considering them to be within the natural variation of a species, a treatment adopted in the Flora of China published in 1996, and also upheld by both the Plants of the World Online database and the International Dendrology Society's Trees and Shrubs Online website.

== Description ==
Buddleja davidii var. superba is chiefly distinguished by the size of its fragrant, violet-purple panicles, which are more than double the length of those of the type, and even longer than those of var. magnifica. The plant is otherwise like the type.

== Cultivation ==
Buddleja davidii var. superba is not known to remain in cultivation.
