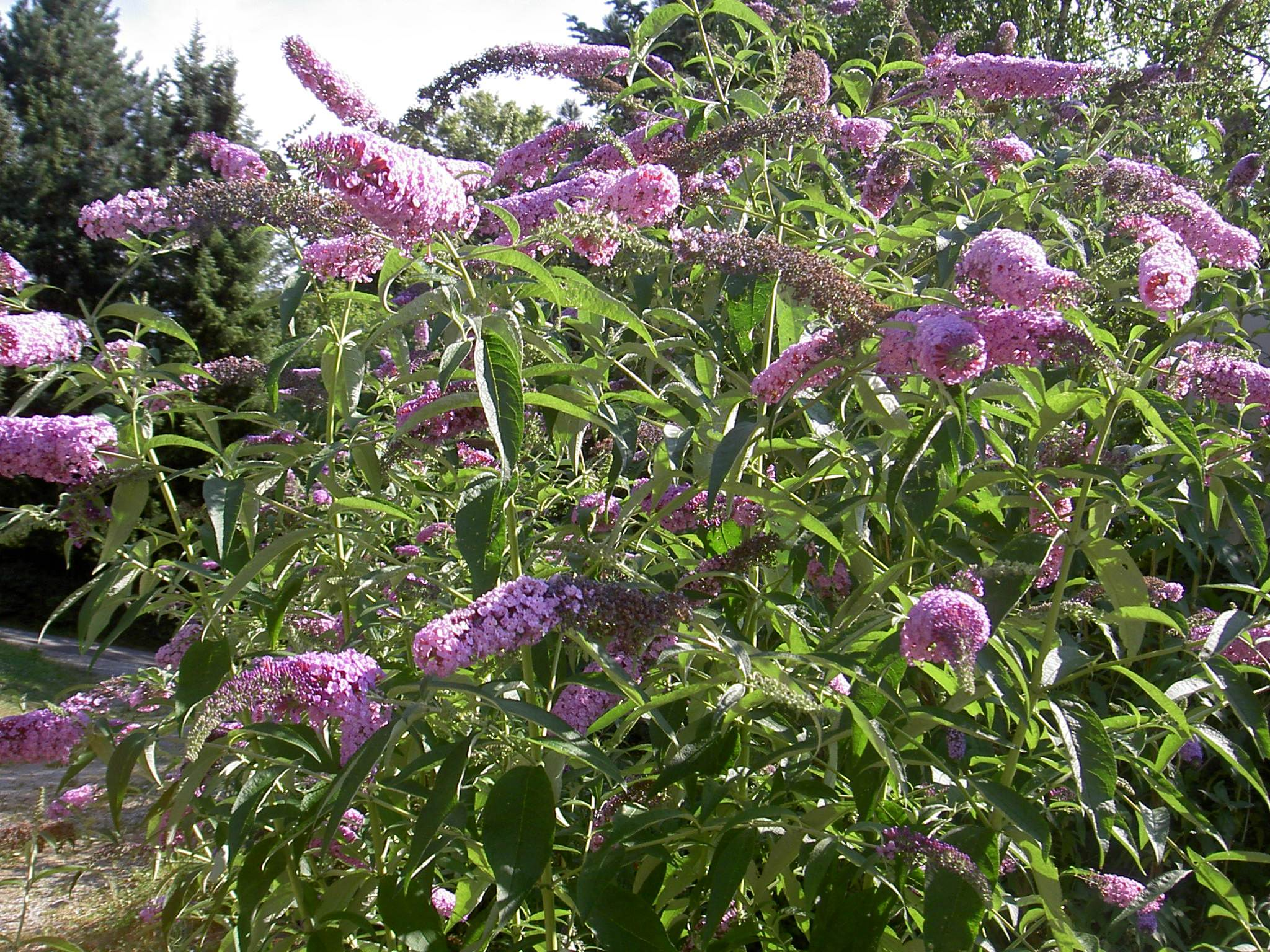

Scientific classification
- Kingdom: Plantae
- Clade: Tracheophytes
- Clade: Angiosperms
- Clade: Eudicots
- Clade: Asterids
- Order: Lamiales
- Family: Scrophulariaceae
- Genus: Buddleja
- Species: B. davidii

Binomial name
- Buddleja davidii Franch.

Synonyms
- Buddleja davidii var. alba Rehder & E.H.Wilson; Buddleja davidii var. magnifica Rehder & E.H.Wilson; Buddleja davidii var. nanhoensis Rehder; Buddleja davidii var. superba (de Corte) Rehder & E.H.Wilson; Buddleja davidii var. veitchiana Rehder; Buddleja davidii var. wilsonii Rehder; Buddleja shimidzuana Nakai

= Buddleja davidii =

Species of plant

Buddleja davidii (spelling variant Buddleia davidii), also called butterfly-bush, orange eye, or summer lilac, is a species of flowering plant in the family Scrophulariaceae, native to most of China except for the far northeast. It is widely used as an ornamental plant, and many named cultivars are in cultivation. The genus was named Buddleja after the English botanist, Reverend Adam Buddle. The species name, davidii, is after the French missionary and explorer in China, Father Armand David, who was the first European to report the shrub. It was found near Yichang by Dr Augustine Henry about 1887 and sent to St Petersburg. Another botanist-missionary in China, Jean-André Soulié, sent seed to the French nursery Vilmorin, and B. davidii entered commerce in the 1890s.

B. davidii was accorded the RHS Award of Merit (AM) in 1898, and the Award of Garden Merit (AGM) in 1941.

== Description ==
Buddleja davidii is a vigorous shrub with an arching habit, growing to 5 m (16 ft) in height. The pale grey-brown bark becomes flaky to deeply fissured with age. The branches are quadrangular in section, the younger shoots and leaves covered in a dense indumentum. The opposite lanceolate leaves are 7–20 cm (3–8 inches) long and 2–7 cm (1–3 inches) broad, grey-green to dark green above, greyish-white tomentose beneath when young and becoming grey-green with age. The flowers are honey-scented, lilac to purple or occasionally white, produced in terminal panicles, usually under 20 cm (8 inches) long but can be 30 cm (12 inches) or more long. The flowers are perfect (having both male and female parts), hence are hermaphrodite rather than monoecious (separate male and female flowers on the same plant) as is often incorrectly stated. Ploidy 2n = 76 (tetraploid). The seeds are very small, and wind-dispersed.

== Taxonomy ==
In a 1979 revision of the taxonomy of the African and Asian species of Buddleja, the Dutch botanist Anthonius Leeuwenberg sank the six varieties of the species as synonyms of the type, considering them to be within the natural variation of the species, and not worthy of separate varietal recognition. Leeuwenberg's taxonomy was adopted in the Flora of China published in 1996, and is also upheld by both the Plants of the World Online database and the International Dendrology Society's Trees and Shrubs Online website. However, as the distinctions of the former varieties are still accepted by some in horticulture, they are listed here:

- Buddleja davidii var. alba
- Buddleja davidii var. magnifica
- Buddleja davidii var. nanhoensis
- Buddleja davidii var. superba
- Buddleja davidii var. veitchiana
- Buddleja davidii var. wilsonii

== Cultivation ==
Buddleja davidii cultivars are widely cultivated worldwide as ornamental shrubs and for the value of their flowers as a nectar source for many species of butterfly. However, the plant does not provide food for butterfly larvae, and buddlejas might out-compete the host plants that caterpillars require.

The species and its cultivars are not able to survive the harsh winters of northern or montane climates, being killed by temperatures below about −15 to −20 °C (5 to −4 °F).

Younger wood is more floriferous, so even if frosts do not kill the previous year's growth, the shrub can be hard-pruned in spring once frosts have finished, to encourage new growth. The removal of spent flower panicles may be undertaken to reduce the nuisance of self-seeding and encourage further flower production; this extends the flowering season which is otherwise limited to about six weeks, although the flowers of the second and third flushes are invariably smaller.

Hardiness: USDA zones 5–9.

There are approximately 180 Buddleja davidii cultivars, as well as numerous hybrids, including with Buddleja globosa and Buddleja fallowiana grown in gardens. Some cultivars are of a dwarf habit, growing to no more than 1.5 m (5 feet).

A plant-evaluation manager at the Chicago Botanic Garden in Glencoe, Illinois (USDA Hardiness zone 5b) rated nearly 50 Buddlejia varieties and cultivars during a six-year trial period, with a summary in 2015 of the characteristics of each and the study's findings. University studies have suggested that nectaring butterflies have greater preferences for some Buddleja cultivars than for others, with Lo & Behold 'Blue Chip' and 'Pink Delight' heading a list of eleven.

Other notable cultivars and hybrids include 'Golden Glow' and 'Silver Frost'.

== Invasive species ==
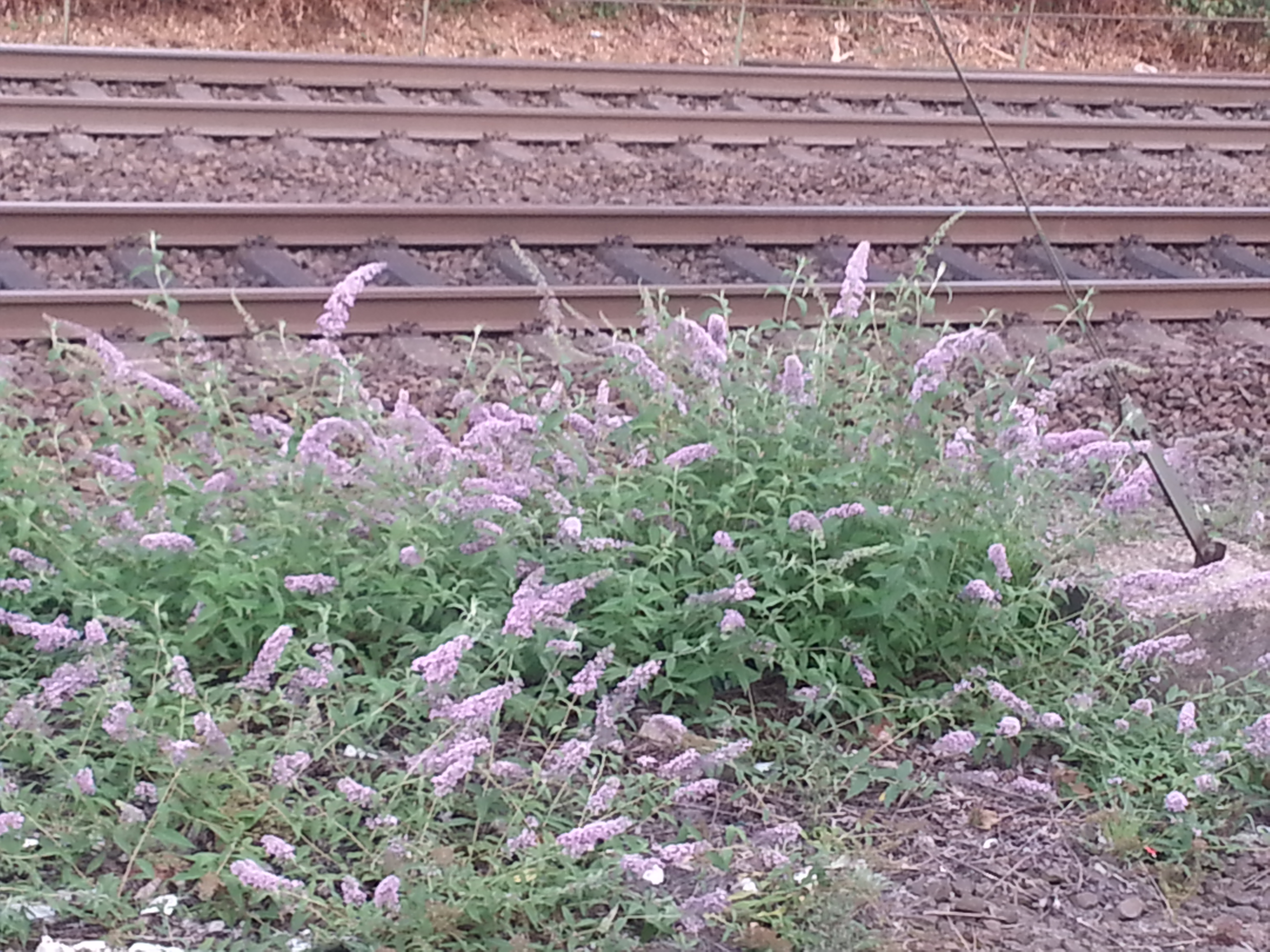
Buddleja davidii self-sown along a rail line at Düsseldorf, Germany (2016)

Buddleja davidii has been designated as an invasive species or a "noxious weed" in a number of countries in temperate regions, including the United Kingdom, the Republic of Ireland and New Zealand. It is naturalised in Australia and in many cities of central and southern Europe, where it can spread on open land, railway lines, urban areas and in gardens.

B. davidii was first documented as an invasive species in 1922, in the United Kingdom at Harlech in North Wales. It is now often seen there along railway lines and on the sites of derelict factories and other walls and buildings. The plant frequently grew on urban bomb sites during the aftermath of World War II, earning it the nickname of "the bomb site plant".

B. davidii is widely marketed throughout the United States, where it has reportedly become invasive in some, but not all, areas within which it has been planted. Although its flowers feed many native butterflies and other pollinators, plantings of the species are now controversial. To prevent seeding and to promote further flowering, its blossoms need to be removed ("deadheaded") as soon as they are spent.

== "Non-invasive" Buddleja cultivars ==
A number of Buddleja cultivars have become available that have a variety of sizes and flower colours and that are either sterile or produce less than 2% viable seed. The northwestern U.S. state of Oregon, which designated B. davidii as a "noxious weed" and initially prohibited entry, transport, purchase, sale or propagation of all of its varieties, amended its quarantine in 2009 to permit those cultivars when approved or when proven to be interspecific hybrids. The adjacent state of Washington has taken actions that are similar to those of Oregon to bring parity to nursery sales between the two states.

Dennis J. Werner developed the "Lo and Behold" Buddleja hybrid series and the 'Miss Ruby' and 'Miss Violet' Buddleja hybrids at North Carolina State University's JC Raulston Arboretum in Raleigh and at the university's Sandhills Research Station in Jackson Springs. He selected most of the hybrids to have a very low seed-set and to be non-invasive. Members of the "Lo and Behold" series vary from 30 centimetres (11.8 in) in spread and height to about 1.5 metres (4.9 ft) in height.

Werner introduced the first of the cultivars (Blue Chip) around 2008. He derived several of the more recent introductions from his earlier hybrids. While some, such as "Lo and Behold" 'Blue Chip Jr', 'Ice Chip', 'Lilac Chip' and 'Pink Micro Chip', produce no viable pollen and are highly female-sterile, the plants are not necessarily fully sterile. Most were still available in 2022.

Peter Podaras developed the "Flutterby" Buddleja series during the 2000s while at Cornell University's Department of Horticulture in Ithaca, New York and patented them in 2011. Podaras selected each of the cultivars for their sterility or low fertility. Although innovative when introduced, several members of the series are no longer commercially available and are rare in cultivation. Monarch Watch recommends planting only male-sterile "Flutterby" cultivars.

Vendors have marketed the following "non-invasive" Buddleja cultivars:

- Buddleja 'Asian Moon'
- Flutterby Flow® Lavender (Buddleja 'Podaras #12')
- Flutterby Flow® Mauve Pink (Nectar Bush) (Buddleja 'Podaras #7')
- Flutterby Grande® Blueberry Cobbler (Nectar Bush) (Buddleja 'Podaras #4')
- Flutterby Grande® Peach Cobbler (Nectar Bush) (Buddleja 'Podaras #5')
- Flutterby Grande® Sweet Marmalade (Nectar Bush) (Buddleja 'Podaras #2')
- Flutterby Grande® Tangerine Dream (Nectar Bush) (Buddleja 'Podaras #3')
- Flutterby Grande® Vanilla (Nectar Bush) (Buddleja 'Podaras #1')
- Flutterby® Lavender (Nectar Bush) (Buddleja 'Podaras #11)
- Flutterby® Peace (Nectar Bush) (Buddleja 'Podaras #6')
- Flutterby Petite® 'Blue Heaven' (Buddleja Podaras #8)
- Flutterby Petite® Dark Pink (Buddleja 'Podaras #10')
- Flutterby Petite® Fuchsia (Buddleja 'Podaras #14')
- Flutterby Petite® Pink (Buddleja 'Podaras #16')
- Flutterby Petite® Snow White (Buddleja 'Podaras #15')
- Flutterby® Pink (Nectar Bush) (Buddleja 'Podaras #9')
- Flutterby Petite Tutti Fruitti Pink (Buddleja 'Podaras #13')
- Inspired Pink® ('Pink Pagoda')
- Lo & Behold® 'Blue Chip'
- Lo & Behold® 'Blue Chip Jr.'
- Lo & Behold® 'Ice Chip' (formerly 'White Icing')
- Lo & Behold® 'Lilac Chip'
- Lo & Behold® 'Pink Micro Chip'
- Lo & Behold® 'Purple Haze' ('Purple Chip')
- 'Miss Ruby'
- 'Miss Violet'

== Gallery ==
Monarch butterfly feeding on a Buddleja flower, Connecticut, United States

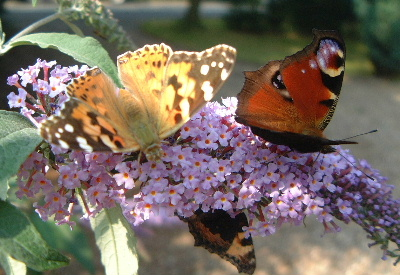
Buddleja davidii flowers with painted lady, peacock and (underneath) small tortoiseshell butterflies

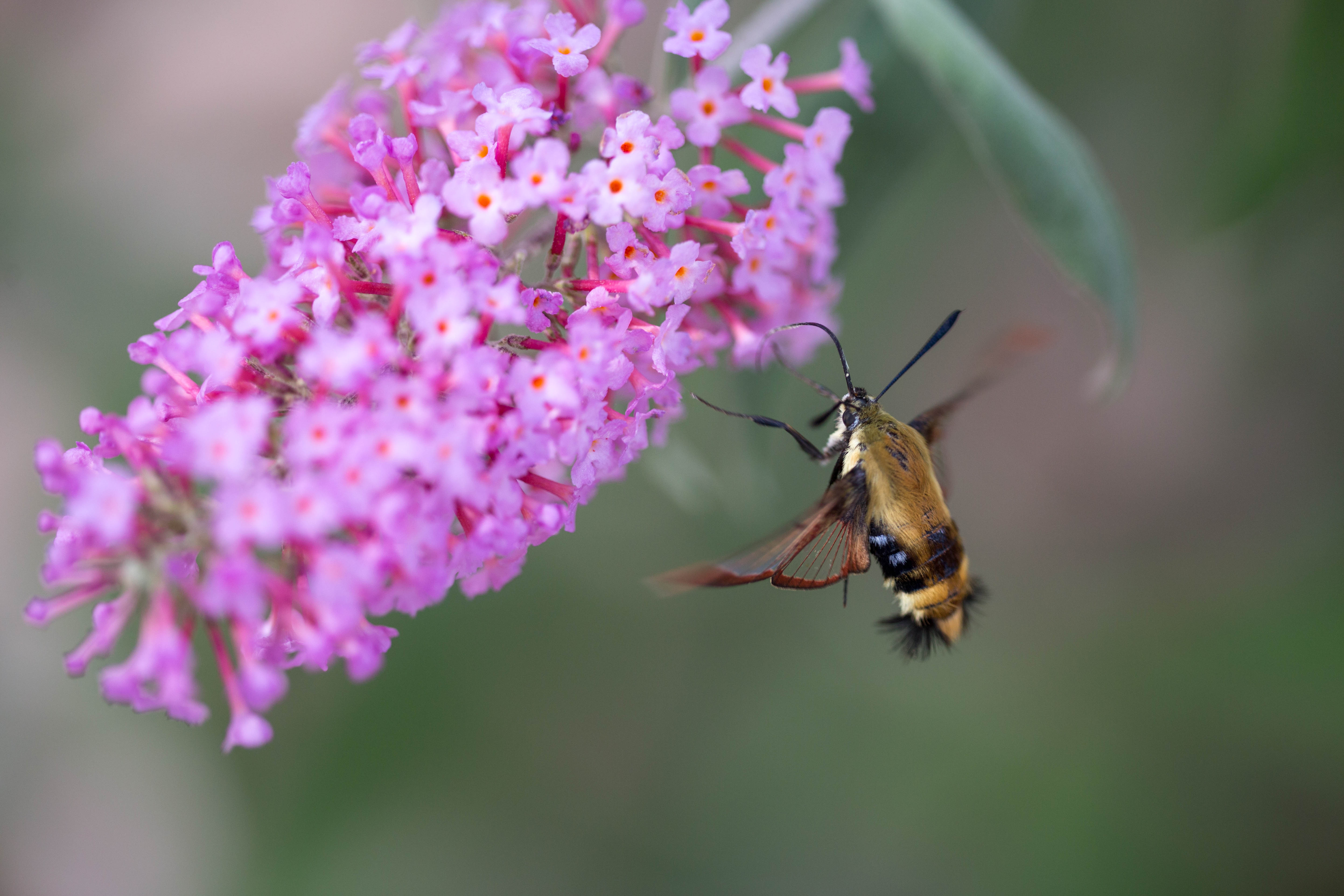
A snowberry clearwing moth carrying pollen on its proboscis while hovering at a Buddleja blossom

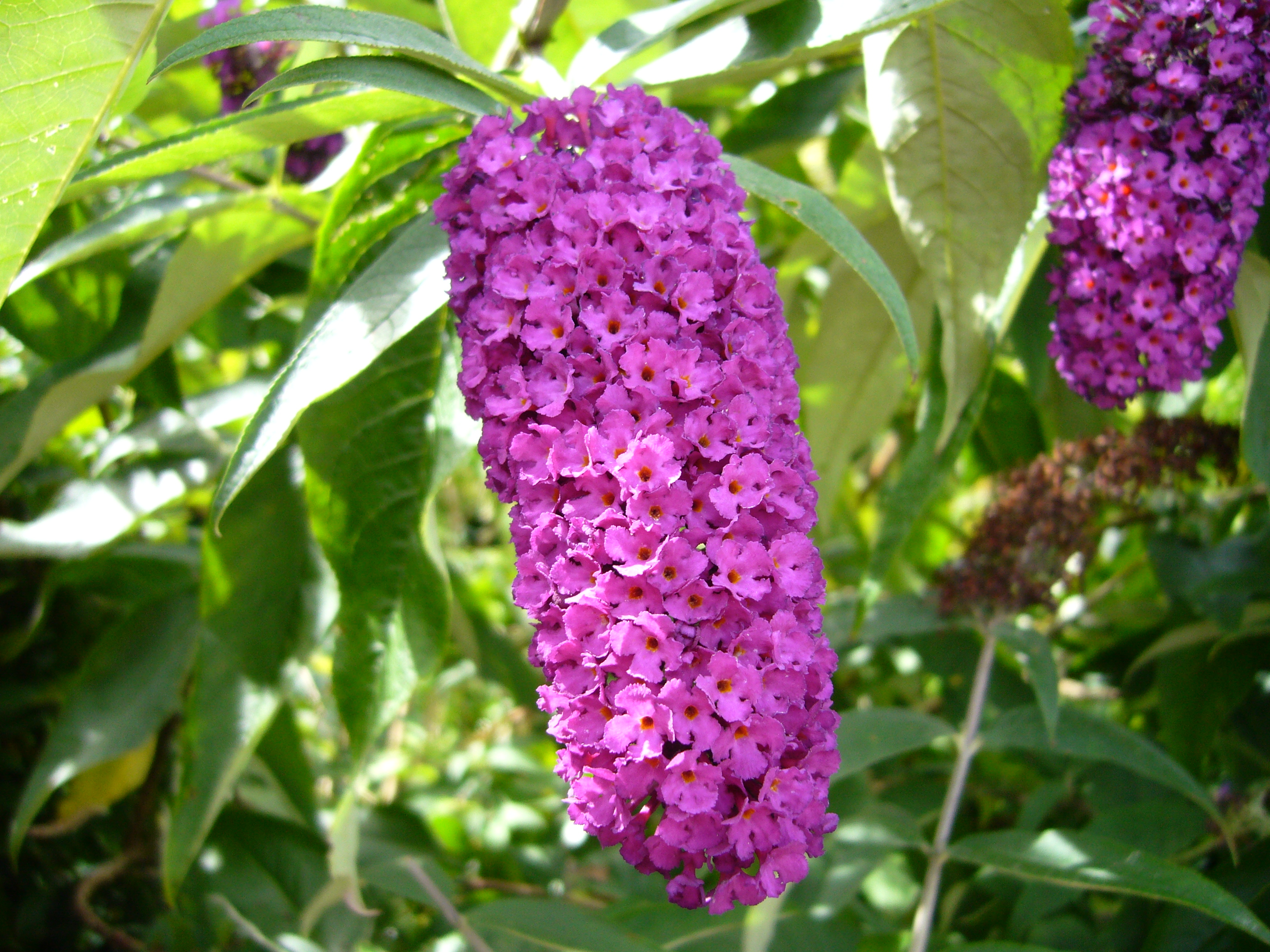
Close-up of purple Buddleja davidii cultivar flowers

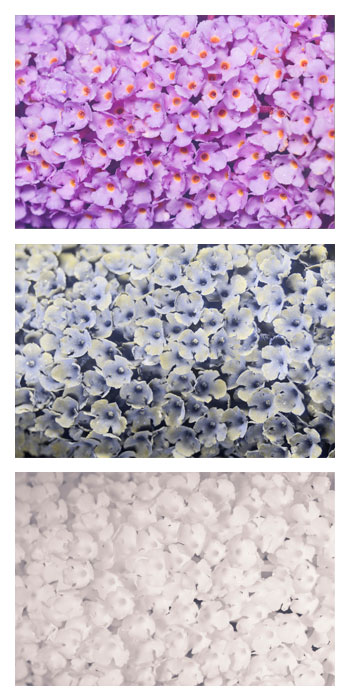
Close-up of purple Buddleja davidii flowers photographed in visible, ultraviolet, and infrared light

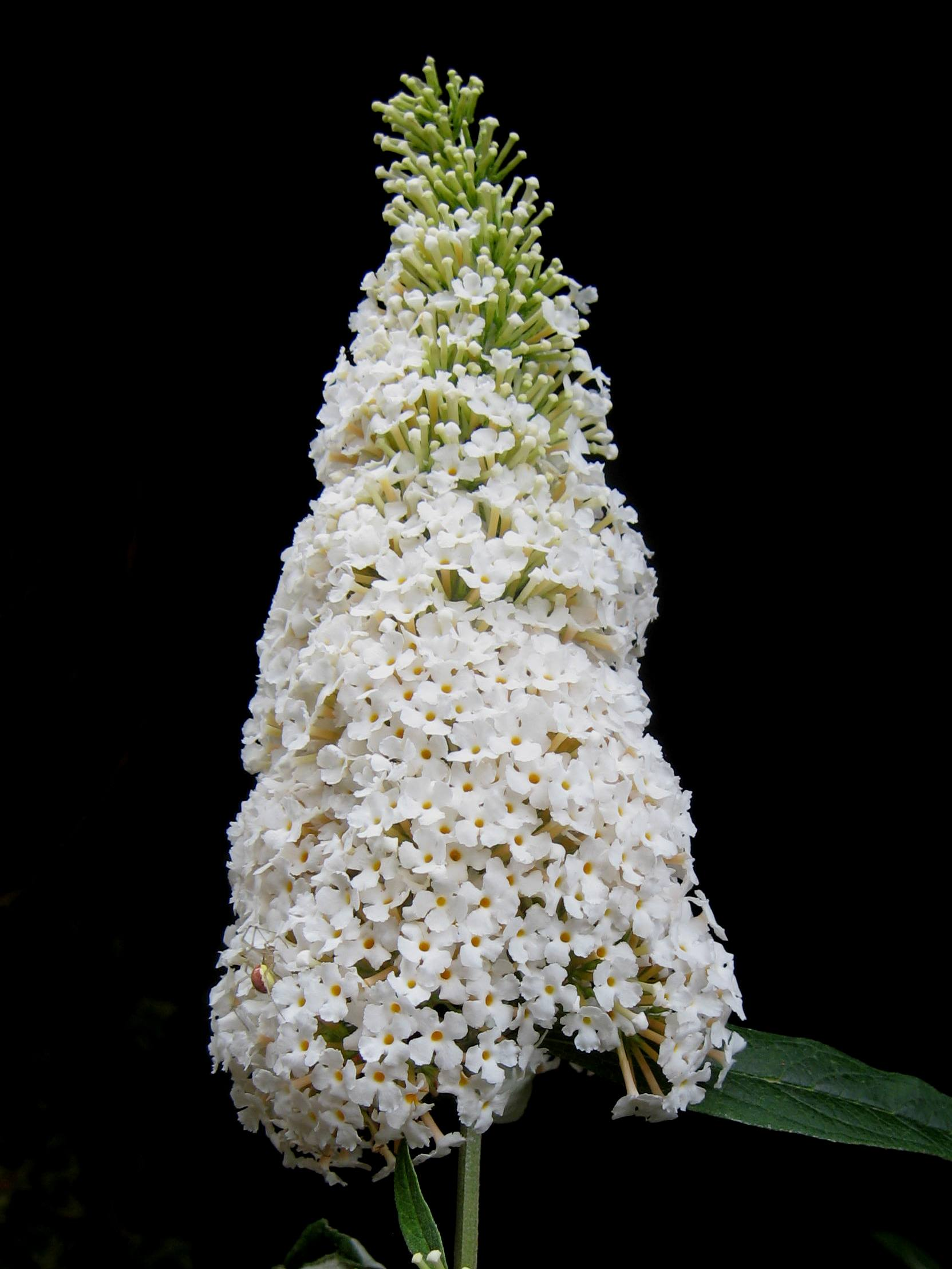
Buddleja davidii 'White Profusion' cultivar flowers

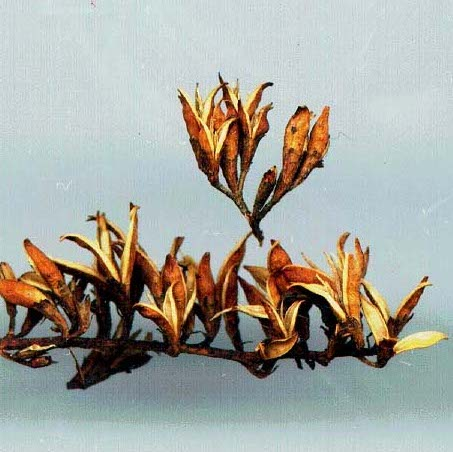
Seed capsules

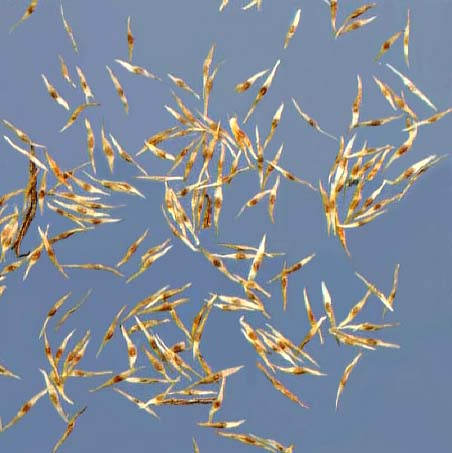
Seeds

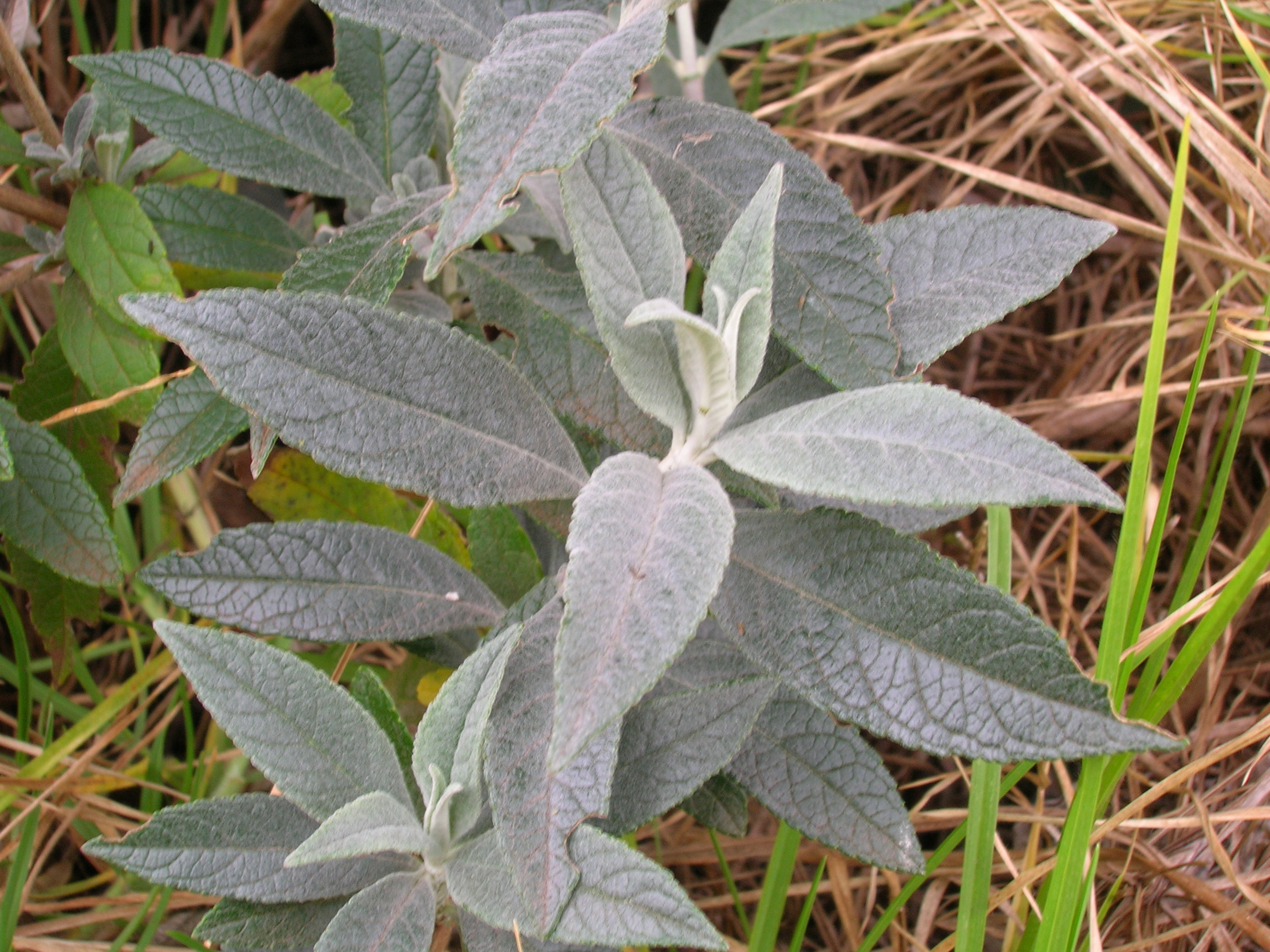
Leaves

== See also ==
- Index: Buddleja — for Buddleja davidii cultivars.
