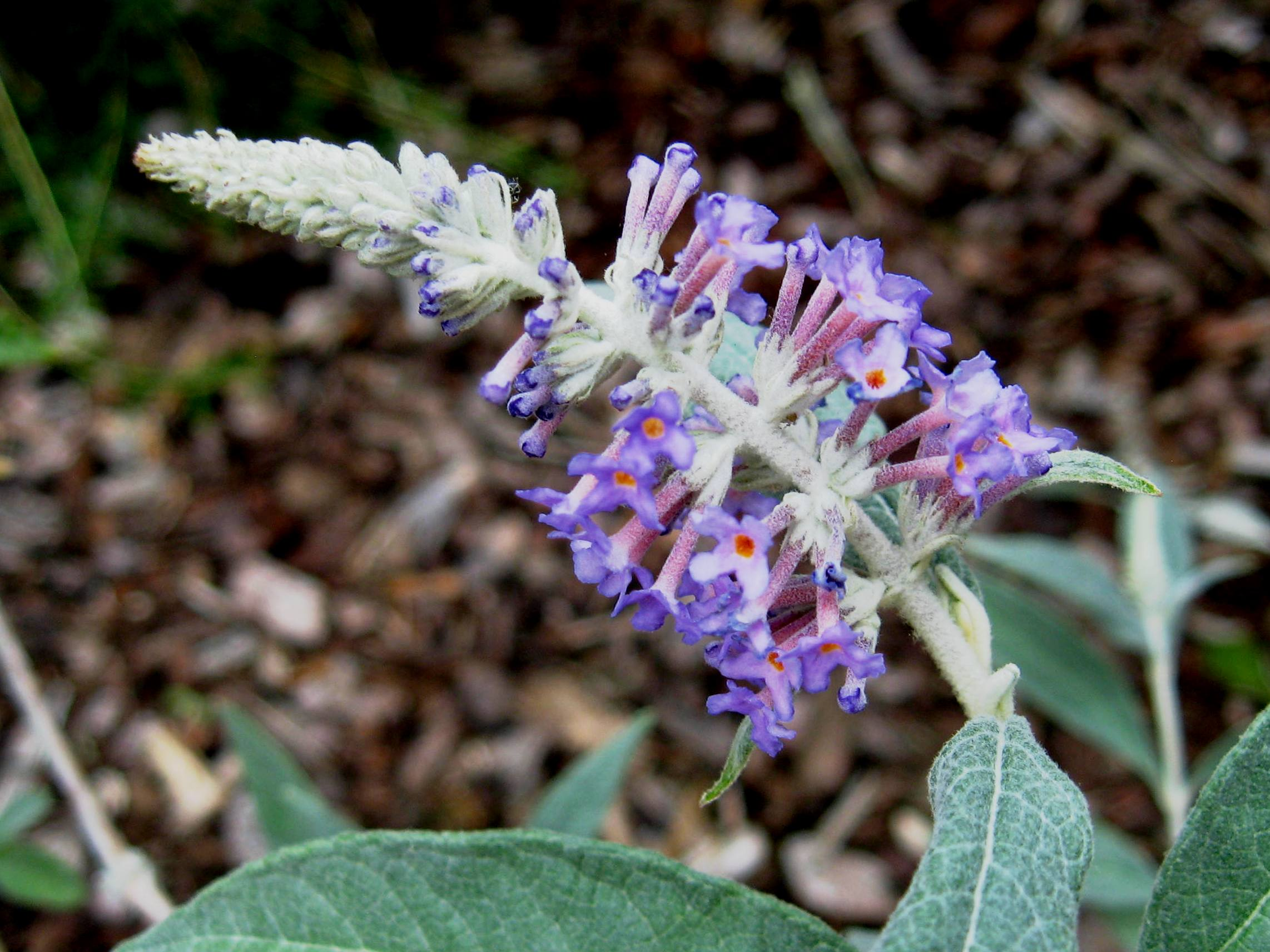

Scientific classification
- Kingdom: Plantae
- Clade: Tracheophytes
- Clade: Angiosperms
- Clade: Eudicots
- Clade: Asterids
- Order: Lamiales
- Family: Scrophulariaceae
- Genus: Buddleja
- Species: B. fallowiana

Binomial name
- Buddleja fallowiana Balf.f. & W.W.Sm.

Synonyms
- Buddleja fallowiana var. alba Sabourin

= Buddleja fallowiana =

Species of plant

Buddleja fallowiana is a species of flowering plant in the figwort family Scrophulariaceae. It is endemic to the Yunnan province of western China, where it grows in open woodland, along forest edges and watercourses. The plant was collected in China by the Scottish botanist George Forrest in 1906, and named in 1917 by Balfour and Smith for George Fallow, a gardener at the Royal Botanic Garden Edinburgh. Fallow had died in Egypt in 1915 from wounds sustained fighting in the Gallipoli Campaign.

== Description ==
Buddleja fallowiana is a deciduous shrub typically growing to a height of 4 m (13 ft). Of loose habit, the plant has young shoots clothed with a dense white felt. The ovate to narrowly elliptic leaves are 4–13 cm (1.6–5.1 in) long by 1 cm (0.39 in) wide, acuminate or acute at the apex; the upper and lower surfaces densely tomentose, bestowing a silvery grey sheen. The inflorescences are slender, thyrsoid, sometimes interrupted, with panicles at the ends of the current year's shoots. The flowers are 5–15 cm (2.0–5.9 in) long by 2–3 cm (0.79–1.18 in) wide, comprising fragrant lavender blue flowers with orange throats, the corollas 2 – 3.5 mm wide by 9 – 14 mm long with erect lobes. The flowers bloom in late summer and autumn.

Growth is significantly slower than that of B. davidii; Bean considered the species more closely allied to B. nivea, although its chromosome number, 2n = 76 (tetraploid), places it alongside the similarly tetraploid B. davidii.

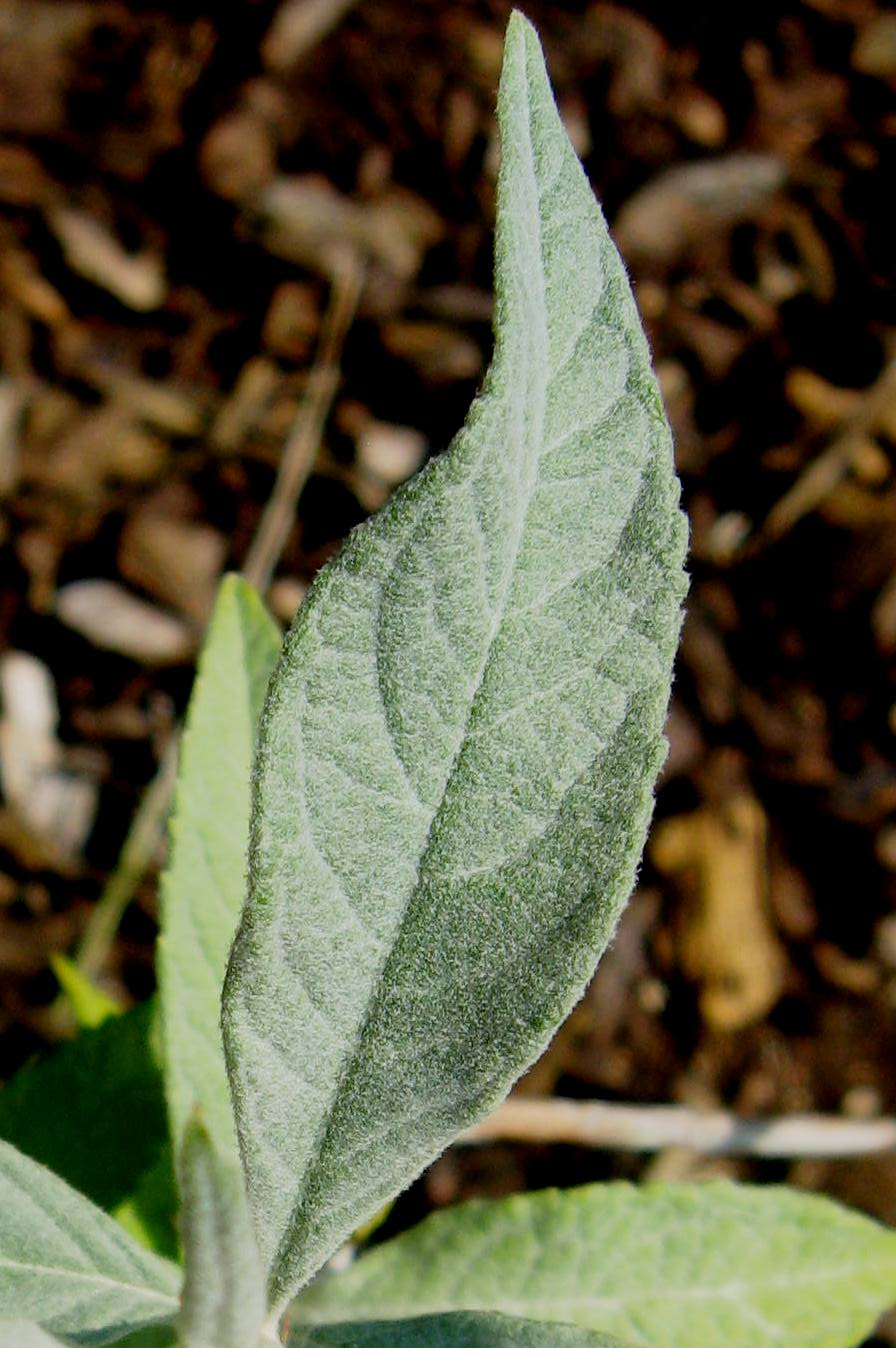

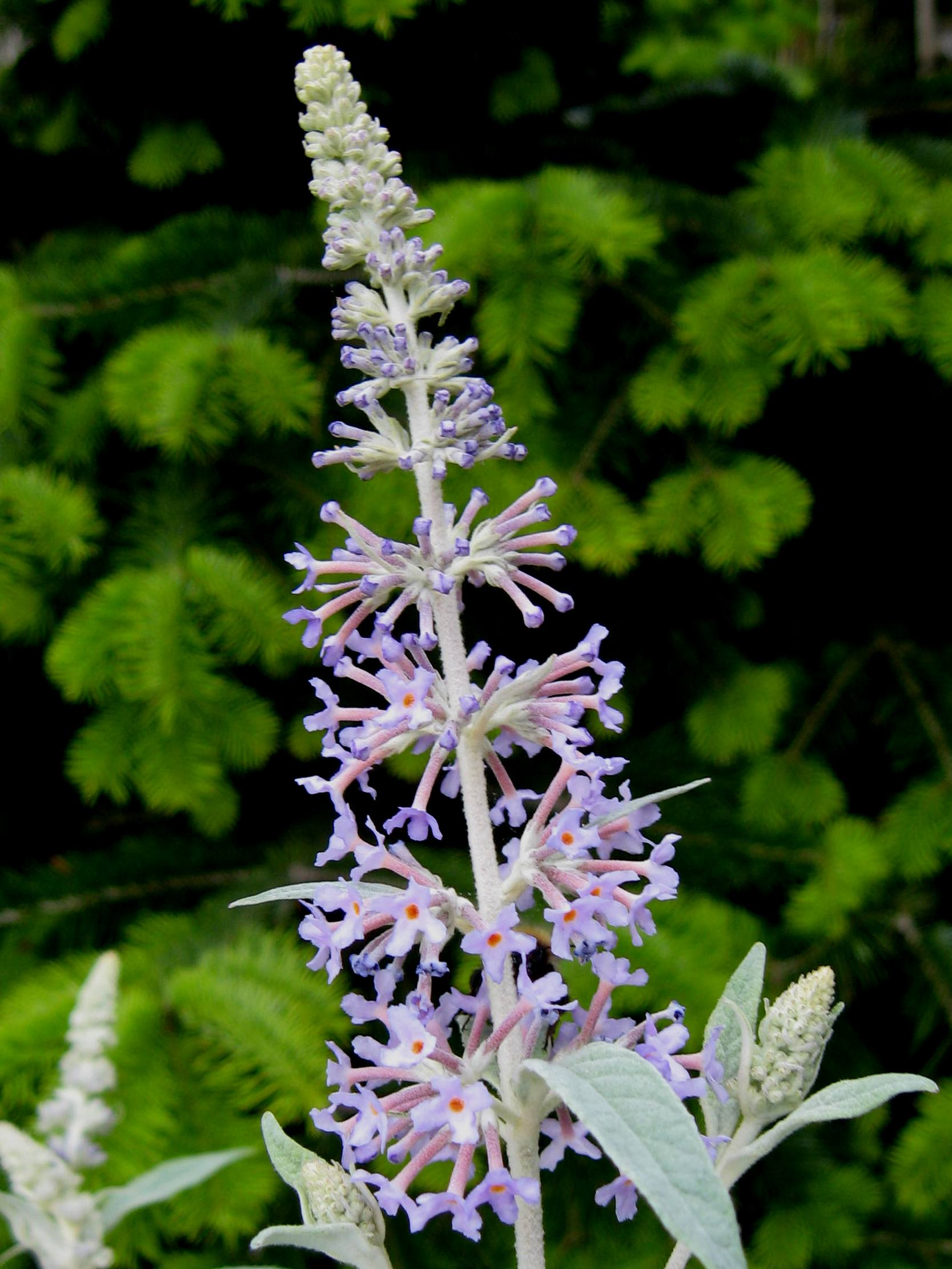

== Cultivation ==
Somewhat tender, B. fallowiana is best grown against a wall. However, if cut to the ground by frost, it will grow again from the base. Hardiness: USDA zones 8–9.

== Varieties ==
- Buddleja fallowiana var. alba.

The variety was considered horticulturally superior to B. fallowiana by Bean, who thought it one of the most attractive of all Buddlejas; it was accorded the Royal Horticultural Society's Award of Garden Merit in 1993. However, its varietal status was challenged by Leeuwenberg, who considered its colouration insufficient to justify it as a variety, and sank it as simply B. fallowiana.

== Hybrid cultivars ==
A number of hybrid cultivars have been raised, invariably through a crossing of the species with Buddleja davidii:

- Buddleja 'Lochinch'
- Buddleja 'Mayford Purple'
- Buddleja 'Vashon Skies'
- Buddleja 'West Hill'
