= Buddleja davidii var. veitchiana =

Scientific classification
- Kingdom: Plantae
- Clade: Tracheophytes
- Clade: Angiosperms
- Clade: Eudicots
- Clade: Asterids
- Order: Lamiales
- Family: Scrophulariaceae
- Genus: Buddleja
- Species: B. davidii
- Variety: B. d. var. veitchiana

Trinomial name
- Buddleja davidii var. veitchiana Rehder

Variety of plants

Buddleja davidii var. veitchiana was collected in Hubei and introduced to cultivation by E. H. Wilson; it was named after the British nurseryman and horticulturist James Veitch by Rehder. The taxonomy of the plant and the other five B. davidii varieties has been challenged in recent years. Leeuwenberg sank them all as synonyms, considering them to be within the natural variation of a species, a treatment adopted in the Flora of China published in 1996, and also upheld by both the Plants of the World Online database and the International Dendrology Society's Trees and Shrubs Online website.

Var. veitchiana was awarded the Royal Horticultural Society's First Class Certificate (FCC) in 1902.

== Description ==
Buddleja davidii var. veitchiana is chiefly distinguished by its dense panicles of lavender-blue flowers with orange eyes. The plant is otherwise like the type.

== Cultivation ==
Now rare in cultivation, a specimen is still grown in the UK, at the Sir Harold Hillier Gardens near Romsey; another is held by the University of Copenhagen's Botanic Garden. The shrub does not appear to remain in commerce in the UK, and was last listed in the RHS Plantfinder in 2010.
