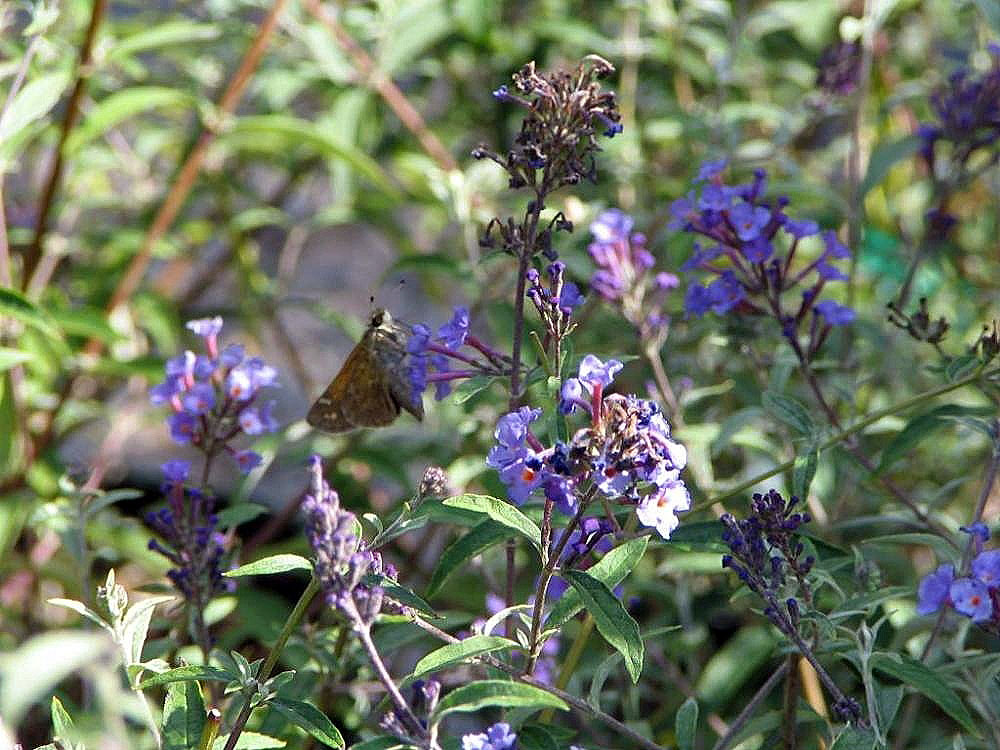

Scientific classification
- Kingdom: Plantae
- Clade: Embryophytes
- Clade: Tracheophytes
- Clade: Spermatophytes
- Clade: Angiosperms
- Clade: Eudicots
- Clade: Asterids
- Order: Lamiales
- Family: Scrophulariaceae
- Genus: Buddleja
- Species: B. davidii
- Variety: B. d. var. nanhoensis

Trinomial name
- Buddleja davidii var. nanhoensis Rehder

Synonyms
- Buddleja variabilis nanhoensis Chittenden

= Buddleja davidii var. nanhoensis =

Variety of plant

Buddleja davidii var. nanhoensis is endemic to Gansu, China, and introduced by Farrer in 1914. The taxonomy of the plant and the other five davidii varieties has been challenged in recent years. Leeuwenberg sank them all as synonyms, considering them to be within the natural variation of a species, a treatment adopted in the Flora of China published in 1996, and also upheld by both the Plants of the World Online database and the International Dendrology Society's Trees and Shrubs Online website.

== Description ==
Buddleja davidii var. nanhoensis is chiefly distinguished by its small size. Rarely growing to a height of > 1.5 m, the shrub has a more compact habit than the type, narrower leaves and shorter panicles.

== Cultivation ==
Now very rare in cultivation, unlike its various 'Nanho' hybrid cultivars, the shrub is still grown in the UK at the Sir Harold Hillier Gardens near Romsey.

== Suppliers ==
There are seven nurseries in the UK still raising the shrub listed in the RHS Plantfinder.
