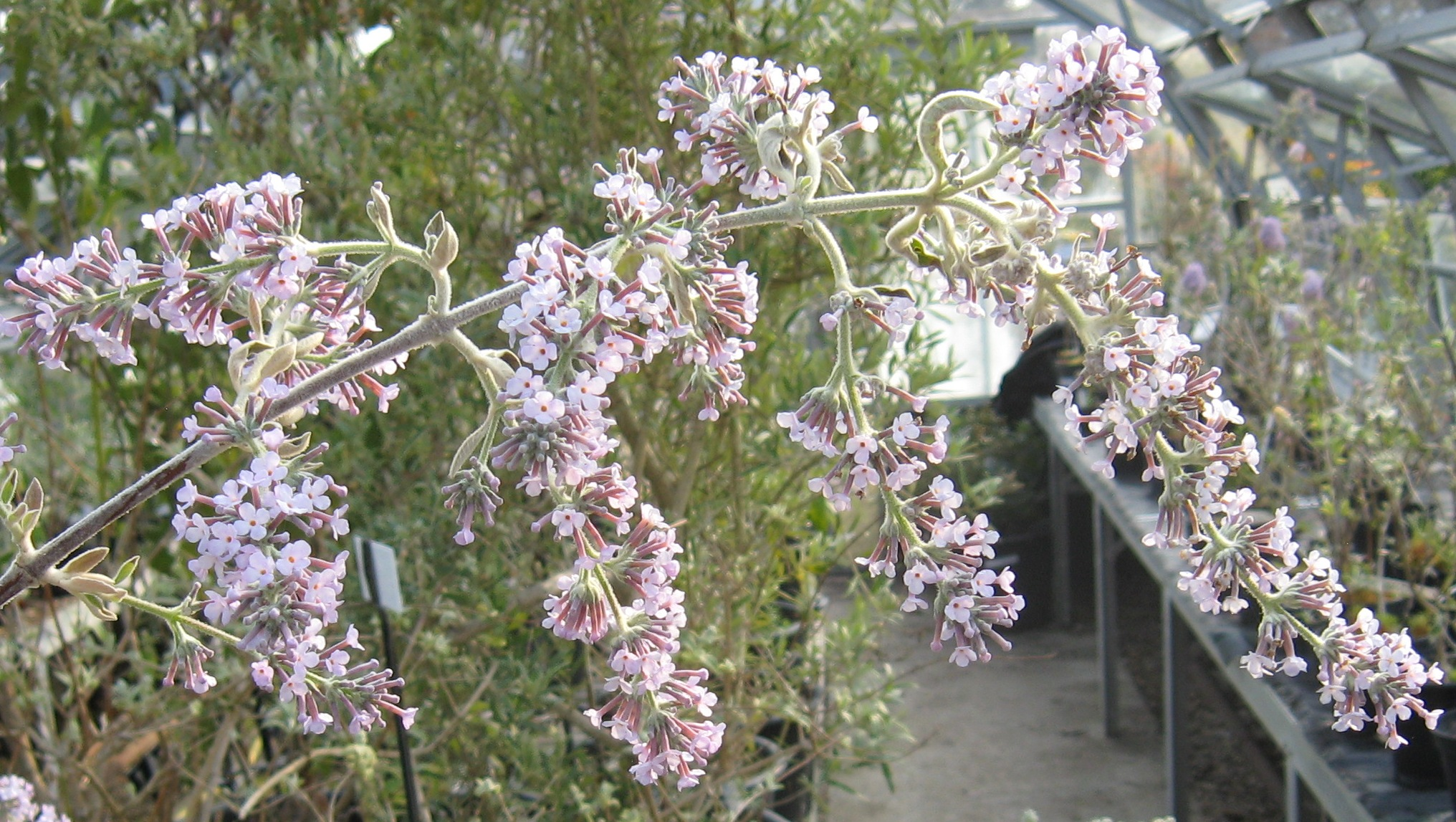

Scientific classification
- Kingdom: Plantae
- Clade: Embryophytes
- Clade: Tracheophytes
- Clade: Spermatophytes
- Clade: Angiosperms
- Clade: Eudicots
- Clade: Asterids
- Order: Lamiales
- Family: Scrophulariaceae
- Genus: Buddleja
- Species: B. farreri

Binomial name
- Buddleja farreri Balf.f & W. W. Sm.

Synonyms
- Buddleja crispa Benth.

= Buddleja farreri =

Species of plant

Buddleja farreri is a xerophytic deciduous shrub endemic to Gansu, China, discovered by Reginald Farrer in 1915. Farrer described the shrub's habitat as "..the very hottest and driest crevices, cliffs, walls and banks down the most arid and torrid aspects of the Ha Shin Fang". Farrer sent seed to the UK shortly afterwards, and it is from this consignment that all the British specimens have been derived.

Buddleja farreri was one of five species sunk as Buddleja crispa by Leeuwenberg in 1979, and later treated as such in the Flora of China; however the original epithet is widely retained in horticulture.

== Description ==
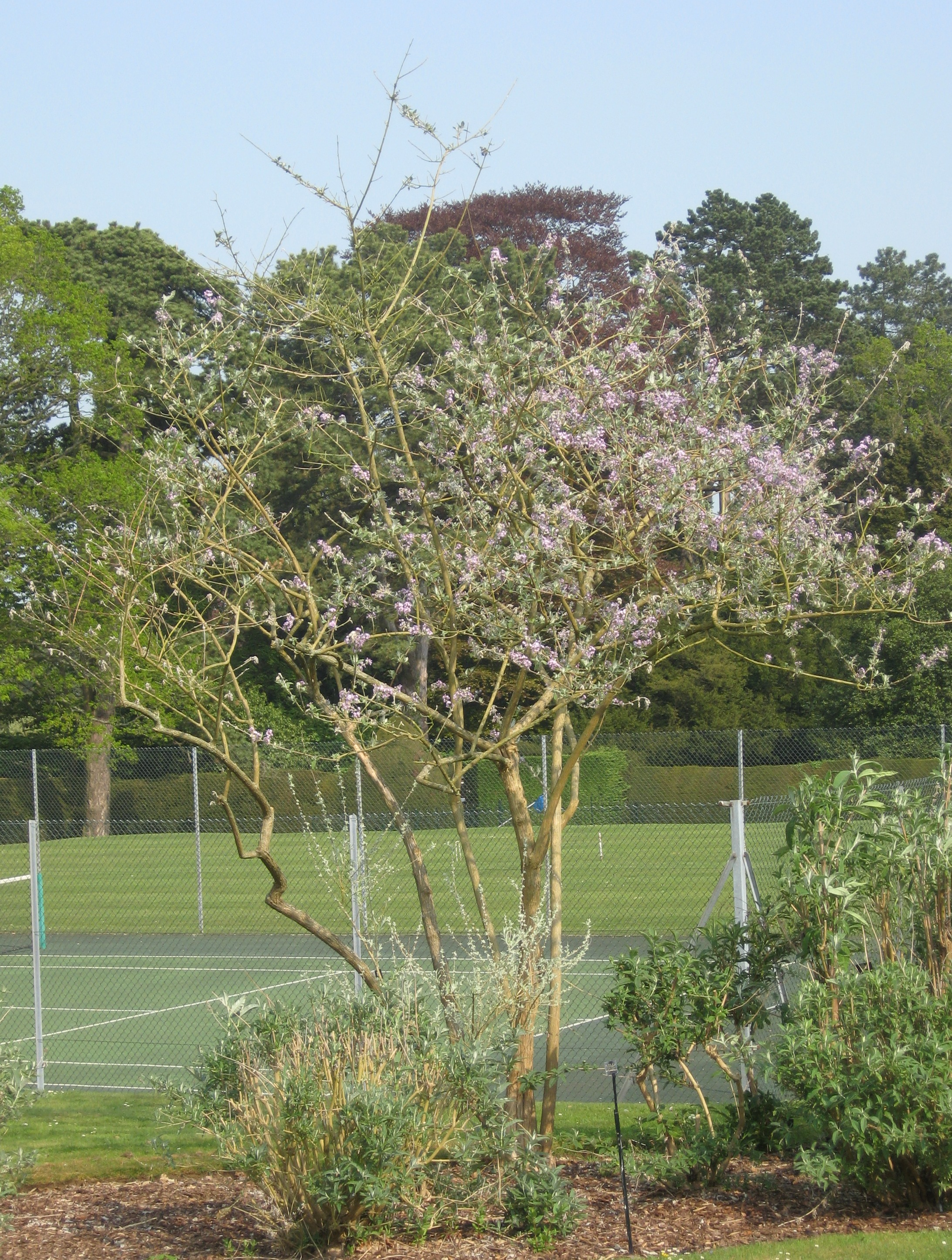
Buddleja farreri, Longstock Park, UK.

Buddleja farreri is a deciduous shrub of sparse habit which, left unpruned, grows to a large size. The flowers appear on the old wood before the leaves at the nodes of the previous year's growth, during April in the UK. The lax panicles are < 20 cm in length and pale lavender in colour. The leaves are initially white, owing to a dense coating of hairs, but ultimately become almost glabrous, with a dark green upper surface; the underside remains white and tomentose. Their size and shape are variable, depending on the type of shoot bearing them. Strong shoots from the base will bear large stipules, and broad, winged petioles, very different from those on ordinary shoots.

Farrer summarized the plant as a "noble bush with ample flannely foliage", however Bean noted that it is probably the cooler, damper UK climate which prevents the shrub from making the striking display that so impressed Farrer in China.

== Cultivation ==
The shrub is hardy in southern Britain, although shoots are killed in severe winters. The plant is self-fertile, and can produce copious viable seed. Softwood cuttings can be struck in June. Hardiness: USDA zones 8–10.

== Notable plants ==
A large specimen is grown as part of the NCCPG national collection of Buddleja at Longstock Garden Nursery, near Stockbridge, Hampshire, England.

== Literature ==
- Bean, W. J. (1970). Trees & Shrubs Hardy in the British Isles, 8th ed., Vol. 1.. (2nd impression 1976). John Murray, London.
- Hillier's Manual of Trees & Shrubs, 5th ed.. (1990). David & Charles, Newton Abbot.
- Stuart, D. (2006). Buddlejas. Timber Press, Oregon, USA. ISBN 978-0-88192-688-0
