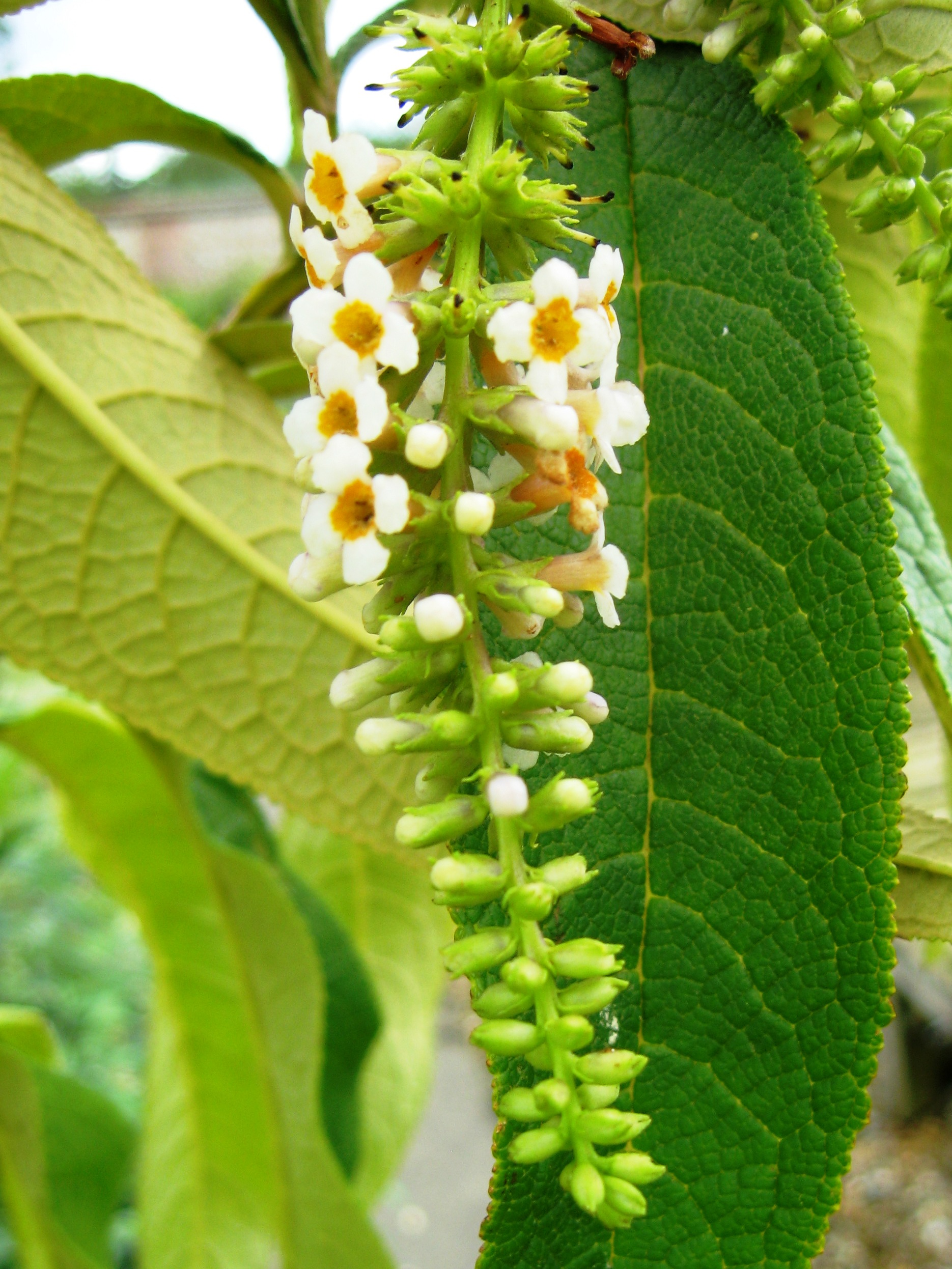
- Buddleja forrestii inflorescence

Scientific classification
- Kingdom: Plantae
- Clade: Tracheophytes
- Clade: Angiosperms
- Clade: Eudicots
- Clade: Asterids
- Order: Lamiales
- Family: Scrophulariaceae
- Genus: Buddleja
- Species: B. forrestii

Binomial name
- Buddleja forrestii Diels

Synonyms
- Buddleja cooperi W. W. Sm.; Buddleja forrestii var. gracilis Lingelsh.; Buddleja henryi Rehder et E. H. Wilson; Buddleja henryi var. glabrescens Marquand; Buddleja latiflora S. Y. Pao; Buddleja limitanea W. W. Sm.; Buddleja longifolia Gagnep.; Buddleja pterocaulis A. B. Jacks.; Buddleja subherbacea Keenan; Buddleja taliensis W. W. Sm.

= Buddleja forrestii =

Species of plant

Buddleja forrestii is a deciduous shrub or small tree widely distributed from India to western China. First described by Diels in 1912, he named the species for plant hunter George Forrest, who discovered the plant in Yunnan in 1904 and introduced it to Western cultivation.

== Description ==
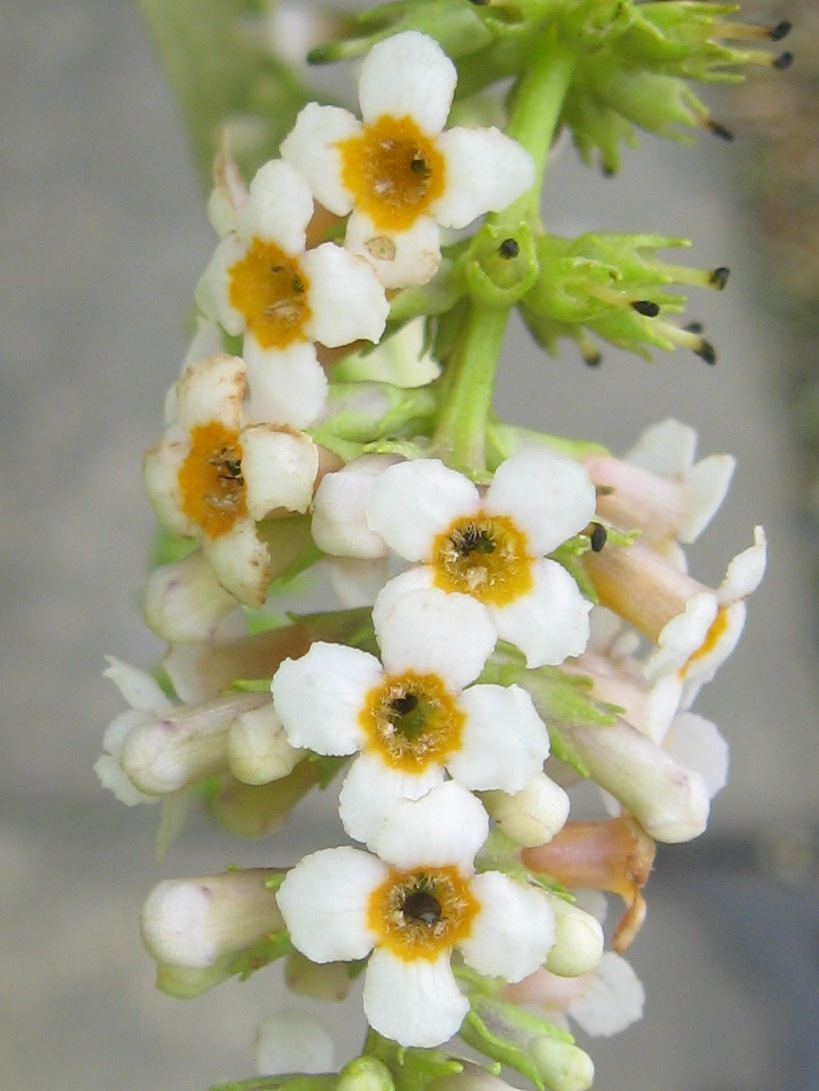
B. forrestii flower close-up

Buddleja forrestii grows to < 6 m in height in the wild. The branches are tetragonous, and bear lanceolate leaves, which are opposite, < 25 cm long; the undersides covered with reddish-brown hairs. The species is chiefly distinguished by its inflorescences, pendulous terminal panicles < 25 cm long comprising virtually scentless flowers which appear in late summer; their colour varies considerably, ranging from pale maroon, through mauve, and blue, to almost white. Ploidy 2n = 114 (hexaploid).

== Cultivation ==
Buddleja forrestii is not fully hardy in the UK, and best grown against a south-facing wall, or in pots which can be removed to the greenhouse or conservatory in winter. A specimen is grown as part of the NCCPG national collection at Longstock Park Nursery, near Stockbridge, Hampshire. Hardiness: USDA zones 8–9.

== Hybrids and cultivars ==
- 'Hotblackiana'. 'Hotblackiana' was derived from a rare, possibly unique, crossing of forrestii with B. davidii var. veitchiana by Herbert Hotblack at Deak's Manor, Cuckfield, Sussex, England, and exhibited at the Chelsea Flower Show in 1952. The hybrid is not known to survive.
