= B. nivea =

B. nivea may refer to:

- Banksia nivea, the honeypot dryandra, a shrub species endemic to Western Australia
- Boehmeria nivea, the ramie, a flowering plant species native to eastern Asia
- Buddleja nivea, a shrub species endemic to western China

== See also ==
- Nivea (disambiguation)
