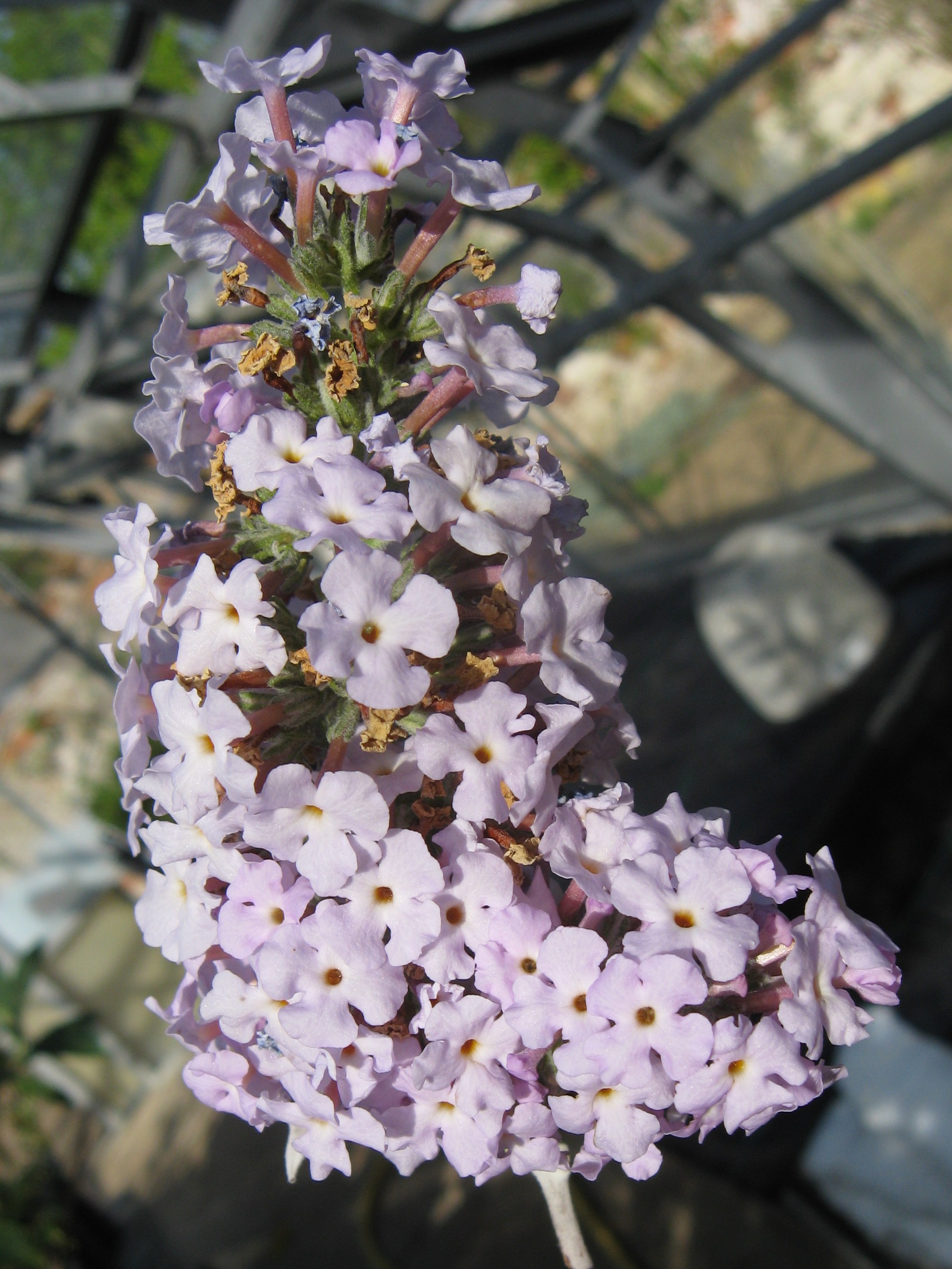
- Buddleja agathosma inflorescence

Scientific classification
- Kingdom: Plantae
- Clade: Embryophytes
- Clade: Tracheophytes
- Clade: Spermatophytes
- Clade: Angiosperms
- Clade: Eudicots
- Clade: Asterids
- Order: Lamiales
- Family: Scrophulariaceae
- Genus: Buddleja
- Species: B. agathosma

Binomial name
- Buddleja agathosma Diels

Synonyms
- Buddleja crispa Benth.

= Buddleja agathosma =

Species of plant

Buddleja agathosma is a deciduous shrub endemic to western Yunnan, China. Originally identified as B. agathosma by Ludwig Diels, it was sunk as Buddleja crispa by Leeuwenberg in 1979, and treated as such in the subsequent Flora of China published in 1996. However, the shrub remains widely known by its former epithet in horticulture.

== Description ==
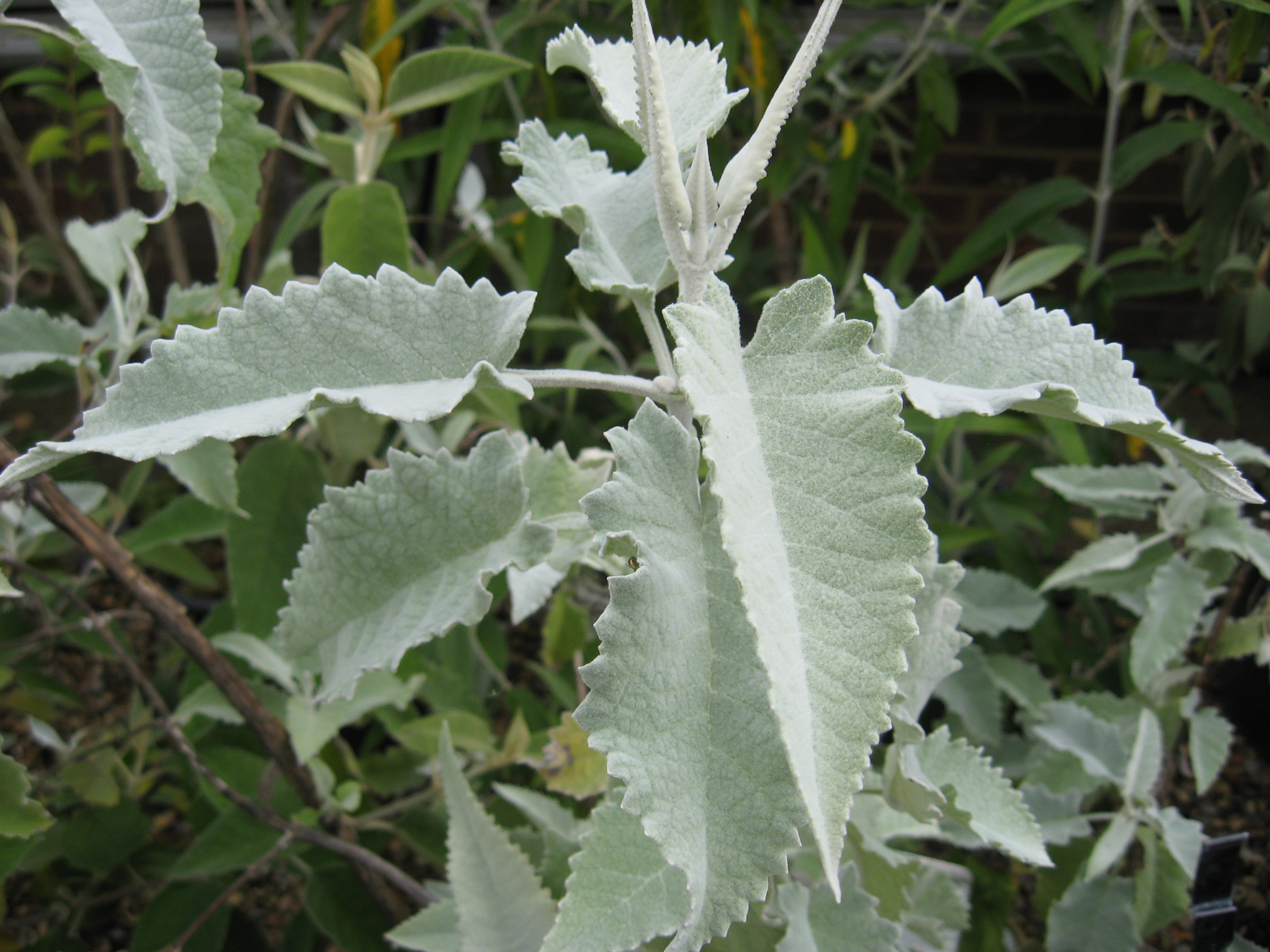
B. agathosma leaves

Buddleja agathosma is a deciduous shrub of sparse habit which, left unpruned, grows to a large size. The deeply toothed leaves are initially white, owing to a dense coating of hairs, but ultimately appear greyish; the underside remains white and tomentose The heavily scented perfect flowers appear on the old wood before the leaves at the nodes of the previous year's growth, during April in the UK; the panicles are < 12 cm in length and pale lavender in colour.

== Cultivation ==
The shrub is hardy in southern Britain, although shoots are killed in severe winters. The plant is self-fertile, and can produce copious viable seed. Softwood cuttings can be struck in June. A specimen is grown as part of the NCCPG national collection of Buddleja at Longstock Park Nursery, near Stockbridge, Hampshire, England.

Hardiness: USDA zones 8–10.

== Etymology ==
'Agathosma', from the Greek words 'agathos', meaning pleasant, and 'osma', meaning smell.

== Literature ==
- Bean, W. J. (1970). Trees & Shrubs Hardy in the British Isles, 8th ed., Vol. 1.. (2nd impression 1976) London
