= Buddleja caryopteridifolia =

Scientific classification
- Kingdom: Plantae
- Clade: Tracheophytes
- Clade: Angiosperms
- Clade: Eudicots
- Clade: Asterids
- Order: Lamiales
- Family: Scrophulariaceae
- Genus: Buddleja
- Species: B. caryopteridifolia

Binomial name
- Buddleja caryopteridifolia W.W.Sm.

Synonyms
- Buddleja acosma C.Marquand; Buddleja eremophilia W.W.Sm.; Buddleja caryopteridifolia var. eremophilia W.W.Sm.; Buddleja caryopteridifolia var. fasciculiflora Z.Y.Zhang.; Buddleja caryopteridifolia var. lanuginosa C.Marquand; Buddleja incompta W.W.Sm.

Species of plant

Buddleja caryopteridifolia W.W.Sm. is a small deciduous shrub discovered by George Forrest in 1913 on open ground at 3,000 m on the Tong Shan in the Yangtze valley, China. The species was described and named by William Wright Smith in 1914.

As it resembled B. crispa, it was sunk under this name by Leeuwenberg, although it has recently been restored as a separate species; the Plants of the World Online database concurs, treating it as a distinct species. It had been suggested in 1947 that some specimens grown under this name at the Royal Botanic Gardens Edinburgh were actually Buddleja sterniana (now a synonym of B. crispa). Although the name is known in horticulture, plants sold as this species are most likely the hybrid B. × wardii of an unknown origin.

== Description ==
Buddleja caryopteridifolia grows to 2 m in height in the wild, and bears small upright terminal panicles with relatively few flowers in the autumn. The colour of the sweetly scented flowers is generally pink or lilac. The opposite grey-green foliage is similar to smaller forms of B. crispa, the leaf blade ovate to triangular and with an irregular toothed margin, shortly petiolate. The species is named from the foliage which can resemble that of several species of the genus Caryopteris.

== Cultivation ==
Authentic examples of Buddleja caryopteridifolia are not currently known in cultivation outside of China.
