= Buddleja davidii var. magnifica =

Scientific classification
- Kingdom: Plantae
- Clade: Embryophytes
- Clade: Tracheophytes
- Clade: Spermatophytes
- Clade: Angiosperms
- Clade: Eudicots
- Clade: Asterids
- Order: Lamiales
- Family: Scrophulariaceae
- Genus: Buddleja
- Species: B. davidii
- Variety: B. d. var. magnifica

Trinomial name
- Buddleja davidii var. magnifica Rehder & E. H. Wilson

Variety of plants

Buddleja davidii var. magnifica is endemic to much of the same area of China as the type; it was named by Rehder and E. H. Wilson in 1909.

The taxonomy of the plant and the other five davidii varieties has been challenged in recent years. Leeuwenberg sank them all as synonyms, considering them to be within the natural variation of a species, and thus unworthy of varietal recognition, a treatment adopted in the Flora of China published in 1996, and is also upheld by both the Plants of the World Online database and the International Dendrology Society's Trees and Shrubs Online website.

Var. magnifica was awarded the Royal Horticultural Society's First Class Certificate (FCC) in 1905.

== Description ==
Buddleja davidii var. magnifica is chiefly distinguished by the length of its violet-purple panicles, which can reach 75 cm (very occasionally 90 cm). The plant is otherwise like the type.

== Cultivation ==
Now very rare in cultivation, specimens are still grown in the UK, at the Royal Botanic Gardens Kew and Edinburgh. The shrub is no longer in commerce in the UK.
