= Buddleja davidii var. alba =

Scientific classification
- Kingdom: Plantae
- Clade: Embryophytes
- Clade: Tracheophytes
- Clade: Spermatophytes
- Clade: Angiosperms
- Clade: Eudicots
- Clade: Asterids
- Order: Lamiales
- Family: Scrophulariaceae
- Genus: Buddleja
- Species: B. davidii
- Variety: B. d. var. alba

Trinomial name
- Buddleja davidii var. alba Rehder & E. H. Wilson

Variety of plants

Buddleja davidii var. alba is endemic to central and western China. The plant has also been treated as a form, and a cultivar ('Alba'). However, Anthonius Leeuwenberg sank var. alba and the other five varieties of davidii as synonyms, considering them to be within the natural variation of a species, a treatment also adopted in the Flora of China published in 1996, and is also upheld by both the Plants of the World Online database and the International Dendrology Society's Trees and Shrubs Online website.

== Description ==
Buddleja davidii var. alba is distinguished by its inflorescences of white flowers with yellow eyes, considered inferior to many of the white cultivars now in commerce, and narrower leaves.

== Cultivation ==
Now rare in cultivation, var. alba is still grown in the UK at the Sir Harold Hillier Gardens near Romsey, and at the Royal Horticultural Society's garden at Wisley in Surrey.

== Suppliers ==
There is one nursery in the UK marketing the shrub, listed in the RHS Plantfinder.
