= Buddleja davidii var. wilsonii =

Scientific classification
- Kingdom: Plantae
- Clade: Embryophytes
- Clade: Tracheophytes
- Clade: Spermatophytes
- Clade: Angiosperms
- Clade: Eudicots
- Clade: Asterids
- Order: Lamiales
- Family: Scrophulariaceae
- Genus: Buddleja
- Species: B. davidii
- Variety: B. d. var. wilsonii

Trinomial name
- Buddleja davidii var. wilsonii Rehder

Variety of plants

Buddleja davidii var. wilsonii is endemic to western Hubei, China, at elevations of between 1600 and 2000 m; it was named after the English plant collector Ernest Wilson by Alfred Rehder. The taxonomy of the plant and the other five davidii varieties has been challenged in recent years. Leeuwenberg sank them all as synonyms, considering them to be within the natural variation of a species, a treatment adopted in the Flora of China published in 1996, and also upheld by both the Plants of the World Online database and the International Dendrology Society's Trees and Shrubs Online website.

== Description ==
Buddleja davidii var. wilsonii is one of the more readily identifiable varieties by virtue of its lax, somewhat pendulous, delicate panicles, under 60 cm long, of lilac-pink flowers; the flowers have reflexed margins to the lobes of the corollas, and the leaves are narrower than the type.

== Cultivation ==
Buddleja davidii var. wilsonii is rare in cultivation, and not known to remain in commerce. A large specimen grew against a wall at Forde Abbey, Dorset.
