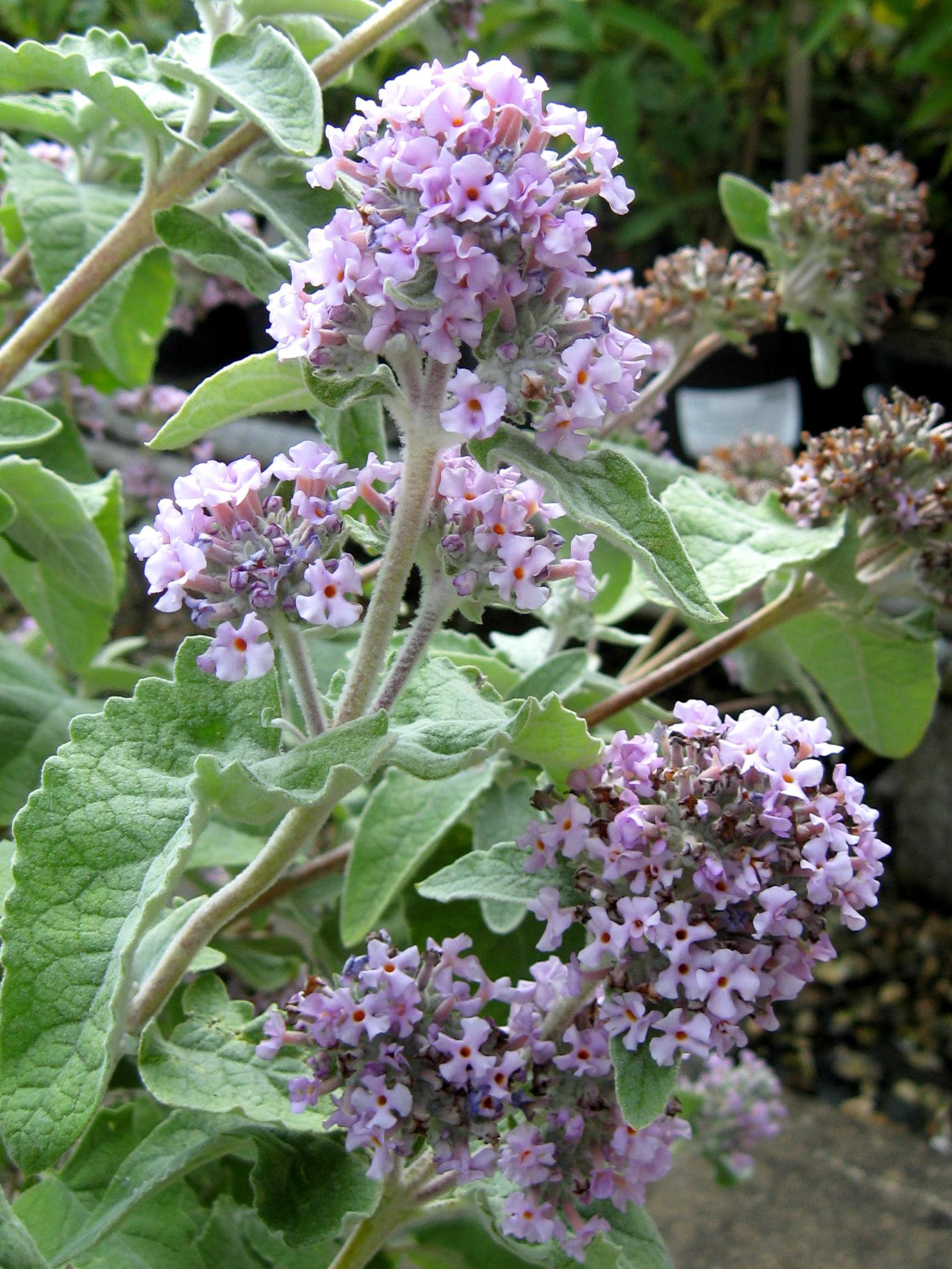

Scientific classification
- Kingdom: Plantae
- Clade: Tracheophytes
- Clade: Angiosperms
- Clade: Eudicots
- Clade: Asterids
- Order: Lamiales
- Family: Scrophulariaceae
- Genus: Buddleja
- Species: B. crispa

Binomial name
- Buddleja crispa Benth.

Synonyms
- Buddleja acosma Marquand; Buddleja agathosma Diels; Buddleja agathosma var. glandulifera Marquand; Buddleja crispa var. farreri (Balf. f. et W. W. Sm.) Hand. - Mazz.; Buddleja eremophila W. W. Sm.; Buddleja farreri Balf. f. et W. W. Sm.; Buddleja hastata Prain ex Marquand; Buddleja incompta W. W. Sm.; Buddleja praecox Lingelsh.; Buddleja sterniana A. D. Cotton; Buddleja tibetica W. W. Sm.; Buddleja tibetica var. farreri (Balf. f. et W. W. Sm.) Marquand; Buddleja tibetica var. glandulifera Marquand; Buddleja tibetica var. grandiflora Marquand; Buddleja tibetica var. truncatifolia (Lévl.) Marquand; Buddleja truncata Gagnep.; Buddleja truncatifolia Lévl.

= Buddleja crispa =

Species of plant

Buddleja crispa, the Himalayan butterfly bush, is a deciduous shrub native to Iran, Afghanistan, Bhutan, North India, Nepal, Pakistan and China (Yunnan, Sichuan, Tibetan Autonomous Region and north to Gansu), where it grows on dry river beds, slopes with boulders, exposed cliffs, and in thickets, at altitudes of 1400–4300 m. Named by Bentham in 1835, B. crispa was introduced to cultivation in 1850, and came to be considered one of the more attractive species within the genus. In 1961, it was accorded the Royal Horticultural Society's Award of Merit, and in 1997 it ranked 8th out of 57 species and cultivars in a public poll arranged by the Center for Applied Nursery Research (CANR) at the University of Georgia, US. However, the species is not entirely cold-hardy, and thus its popularity is not as ubiquitous as it might otherwise be.

== Taxonomy ==
In his 1979 revision of the taxonomy of the African and Asiatic species of Buddleja, the Dutch botanist Toon Leeuwenberg sank five Chinese species into synonymy with B. crispa on the basis of the similarity in the individual flowers, dismissing the wide ranges in size of both inflorescence and leaf as attributable to environmental factors. Leeuwenberg's taxonomy was adopted in the Flora of China published in 1996. The five species synonymised, still often accepted in horticulture, are Buddleja agathosma, Buddleja caryopteridifolia, Buddleja farreri, Buddleja sterniana, and Buddleja tibetica; of these, the Plants of the World Online database treats B. caryopteridifolia as a distinct species, but concurs with Leeuwenberg in the synonymy of the other four.

== Description ==
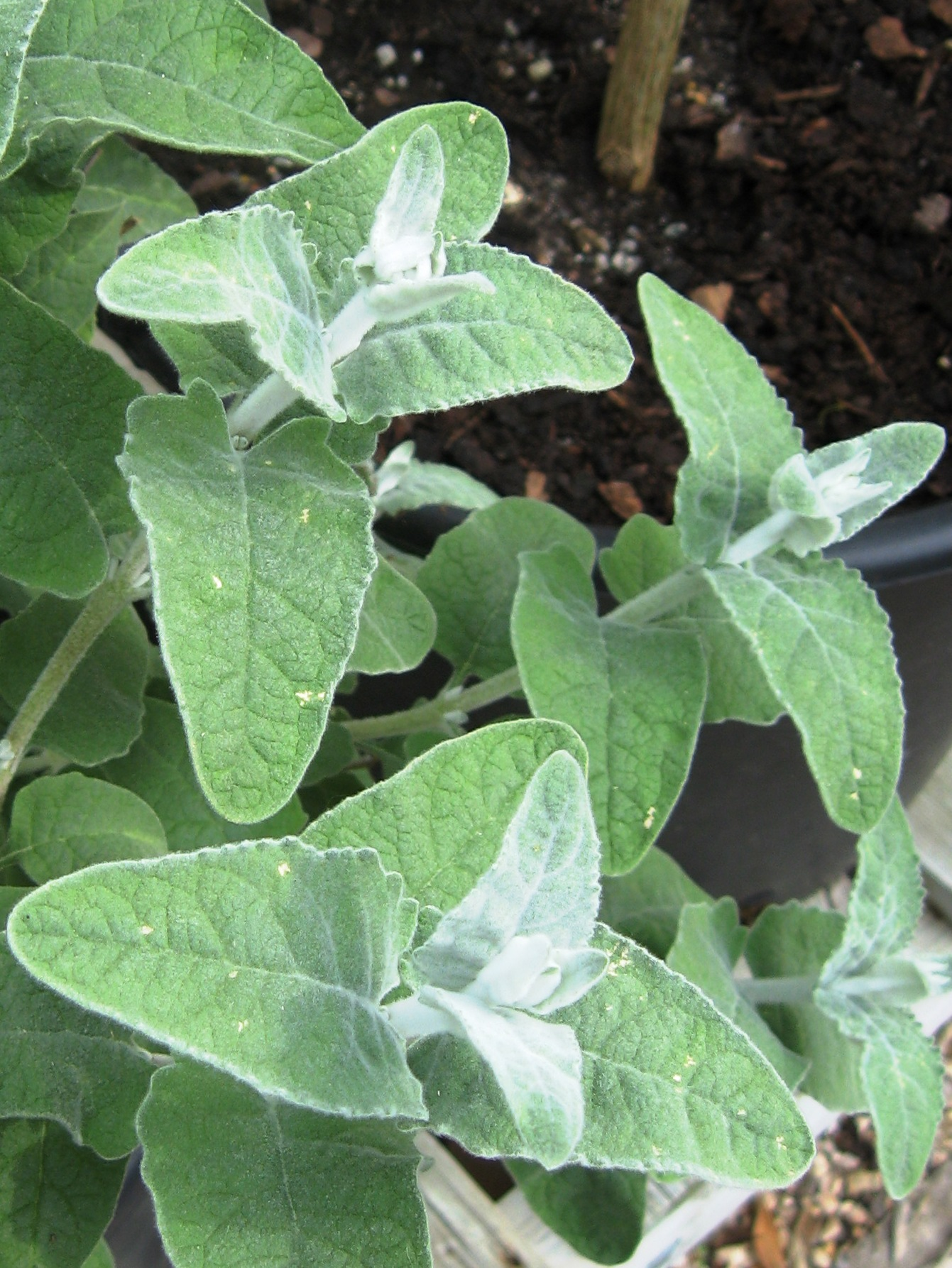
B. crispa foliage.

The original B. crispa as known to horticulture, cloned from a plant grown at Aldenham, England (see Cultivation), is a comparatively slow growing deciduous shrub of bushy habit, reaching 3.5 m high, more in spread. Young twigs and both sides of the leaves are covered with a white or tawny loose felt. The leaves are ovate-lanceolate, 5–12 cm long by 2.0–4.5 cm wide, with petioles 0,6–2,5 cm. The shrub flowers from February to August. The fragrant flowers form terminal panicles 7–10 cm long by 5 cm wide. The corolla is lilac, with an orange throat. Ploidy 2n = 38 (diploid).

The former species sunk by Leeuwenberg, as listed in the preceding section, have, with the exception of "B. sterniana", inflorescences of varying density < 12 cm long, complemented by leaves of variable size and shape, often covered in a dense white tomentum when young. The exception, "B. sterniana", has markedly smaller inflorescences and leaves < 6 cm long.

== Cultivation ==
Buddleja crispa needs a well-drained soil and full sun; Bean states that it is at its best when grown on a wall. Most if not all the specimens in commerce in the UK derive from a plant in the Aldenham collection amassed by Vicary Gibbs. Hardiness: USDA zones 8–9.

== Notable specimens ==
A particularly tall example of tree-like form over 4.5 m high is grown near an entrance to the grassland and aquatic gardens at the Royal Botanic Gardens, Kew.

== Cultivars ==
- Buddleja crispa 'Huimoon' (selling name Moon Dance)

== Literature ==
- Bean, W. J. (1970). Trees & Shrubs Hardy in the British Isles, 8th ed., Vol. 1.. (2nd impression 1976) London
- Hillier & Sons. (1990). Hillier's Manual of Trees & Shrubs, 5th ed.. David & Charles, Newton Abbot.
- Krüssmann, G. (1984). Manual of Cultivated Broad-leaved Trees & Shrubs, Vol. 1. Engl. transl. London, 1984.
- Phillips, R. & Rix, M. (1989). Shrubs, Pan Books, London.
- Stuart, D. (2006). Buddlejas. Timber Press, Oregon, USA. ISBN 978-0-88192-688-0
