= Lucien Sabourin =

French botanist (1904–1987)

Lucien Sabourin (1904–1987) was a French botanist best known for his work with the City of Paris parks department. An autodidact, Sabourin initially worked as a gardener with Vilmorin-Andrieux, rising to the rank of Head of Cultures.

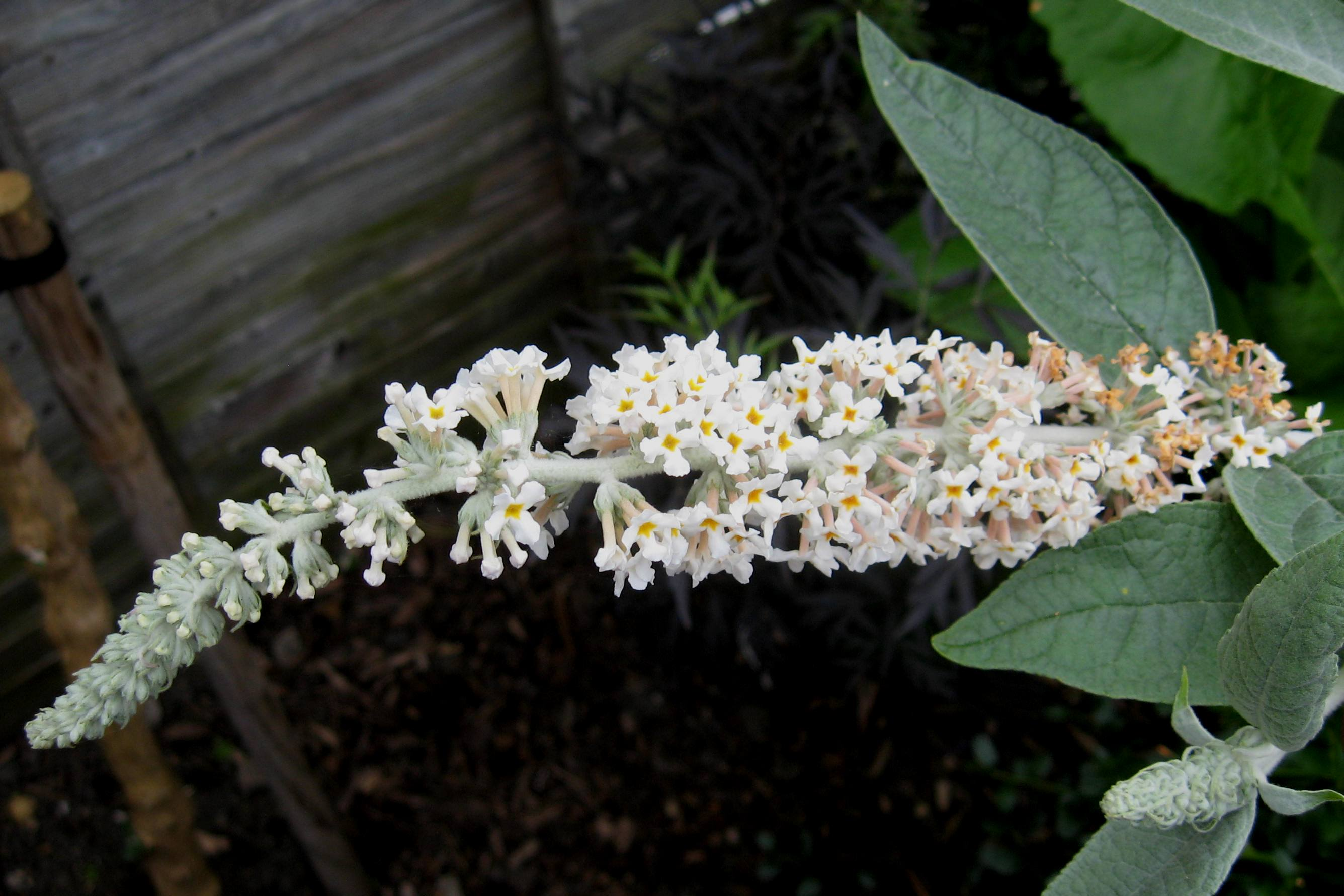
Buddleja fallowiana var. alba Sabourin

Sabourin left Vilmorin in 1931 to become Head of Studies of the Municipal School of Horticulture at Breuil, where he also reorganized the collections and library. After World War II Sabourin gained the rank of Engineer, and in 1959 was appointed director of the 'Florist Municipal de la Porte d'Auteuil' (:City of Paris Dept. of Plant Production). He was for a long time treasurer of the National Horticultural Society of France, before becoming its librarian, also directing the French TV series 'Cultivons notre jardin' (Let's Cultivate Our Garden'). A keen writer, he reviewed Mottet's books on carnations and climbing plants. However, Sabourin is known internationally only as the author of the name Buddleja fallowiana var. alba.

Sabourin was appointed an Officer in l'Ordre National du Mérite in 1969, and also awarded the Gold Medal of the City of Paris.

== Publications ==
- Sabourin, L. (1929). Buddleja fallowiana var. alba. Revue Hort. (Paris): 101: 418. 1929.
