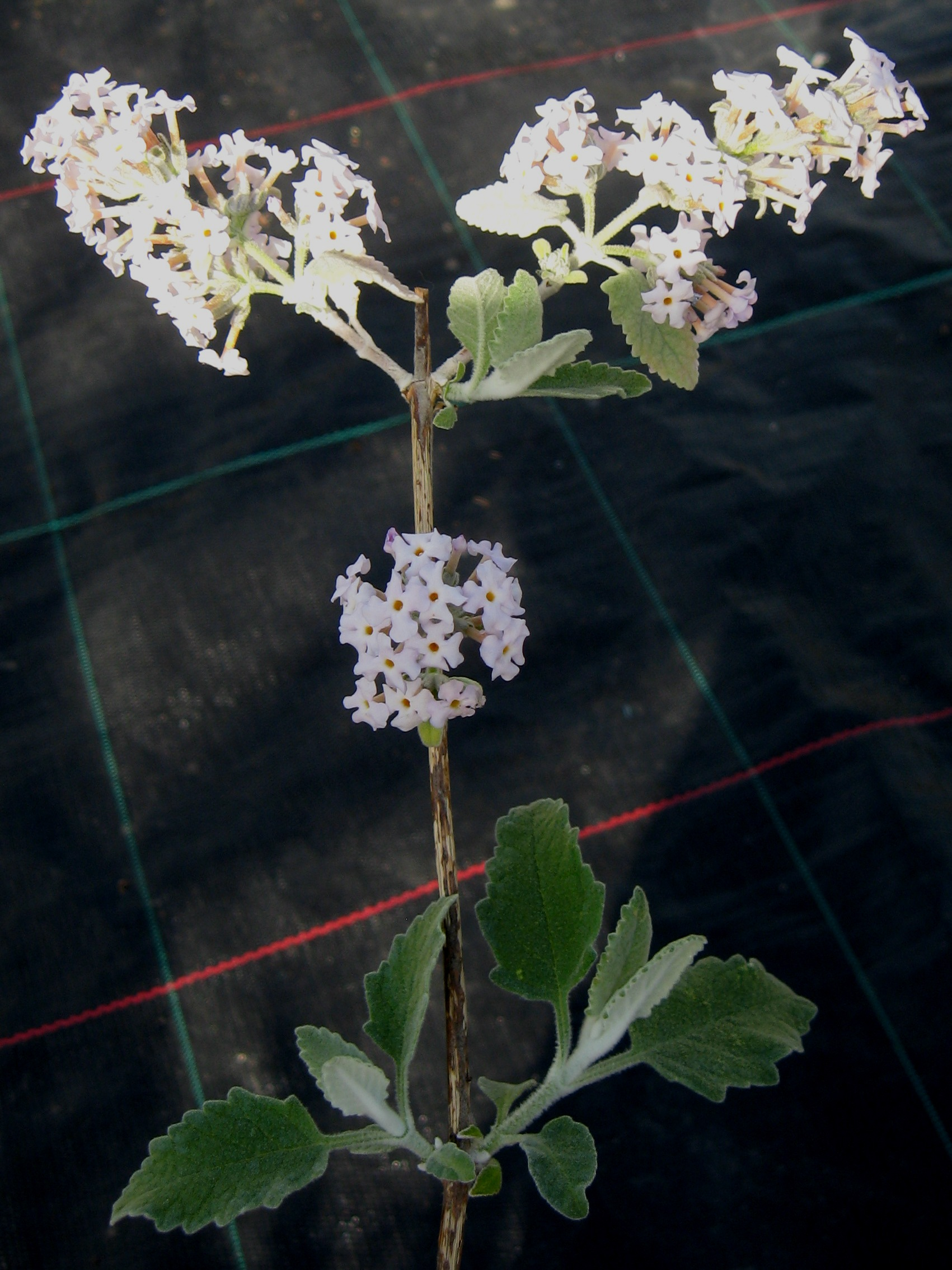

Scientific classification
- Kingdom: Plantae
- Clade: Tracheophytes
- Clade: Angiosperms
- Clade: Eudicots
- Clade: Asterids
- Order: Lamiales
- Family: Scrophulariaceae
- Genus: Buddleja
- Species: B. sterniana

Binomial name
- Buddleja sterniana Cotton

Synonyms
- Buddleja crispa Benth.; Buddleja caryopteridifolia W. W. Sm.

= Buddleja sterniana =

Species of plant

Buddleja sterniana was a species sunk as Buddleja crispa by Leeuwenberg in 1979, and treated as such in the subsequent Flora of China. However, the plant remains widely known by its former epithet in horticulture.

The shrub's origin is uncertain but, as it was originally collected by Forrest, may reasonably be assumed to be from Yunnan, China. Seed was distributed in the UK by Reginald Cory in 1922.

== Description ==
Buddleja sterniana is a deciduous multistemmed shrub often growing to > 3 m high, when it can become straggly unless pruned hard. The faintly-scented flowers are pale lavender, with an orange eye, and arranged in small (< 6 cm long) panicles, which appear before the leaves on the previous year's growth, during April in the UK. The leaves are much smaller than those of the type; the undersides are typically covered with a white tomentum.

== Cultivation ==
The shrub was originally grown at the Royal Botanic Garden Edinburgh, but by the Second World War only survived in the UK in the Chalk Garden of the eponymous Colonel Stern in Worthing, Sussex. Softwood cuttings can easily be struck in June. The shrub now features in the NCCPG National Collection held by the Longstock Park Nursery, near Stockbridge, in Hampshire, England. All the specimens in commerce probably derive from Forrest seed collections. Hardiness: USDA zones 8–9.

== Literature ==
- Bean, W. J. (1970). Trees & Shrubs Hardy in the British Isles, 8th ed., Vol. 1.. (2nd impression 1976) London
- Hillier & Sons. Hillier's Manual of Trees & Shrubs, 5th ed.. (1990). David & Charles, Newton Abbot.
- Leeuwenberg, A. J. M. (1979) The Loganiaceae of Africa XVIII Buddleja L. II, Revision of the African & Asiatic species. H. Veenman & Zonen B. V., Wageningen, Netherlands.
- Stuart, D. (2006). Buddlejas. Timber Press, Oregon, USA. ISBN 978-0-88192-688-0
