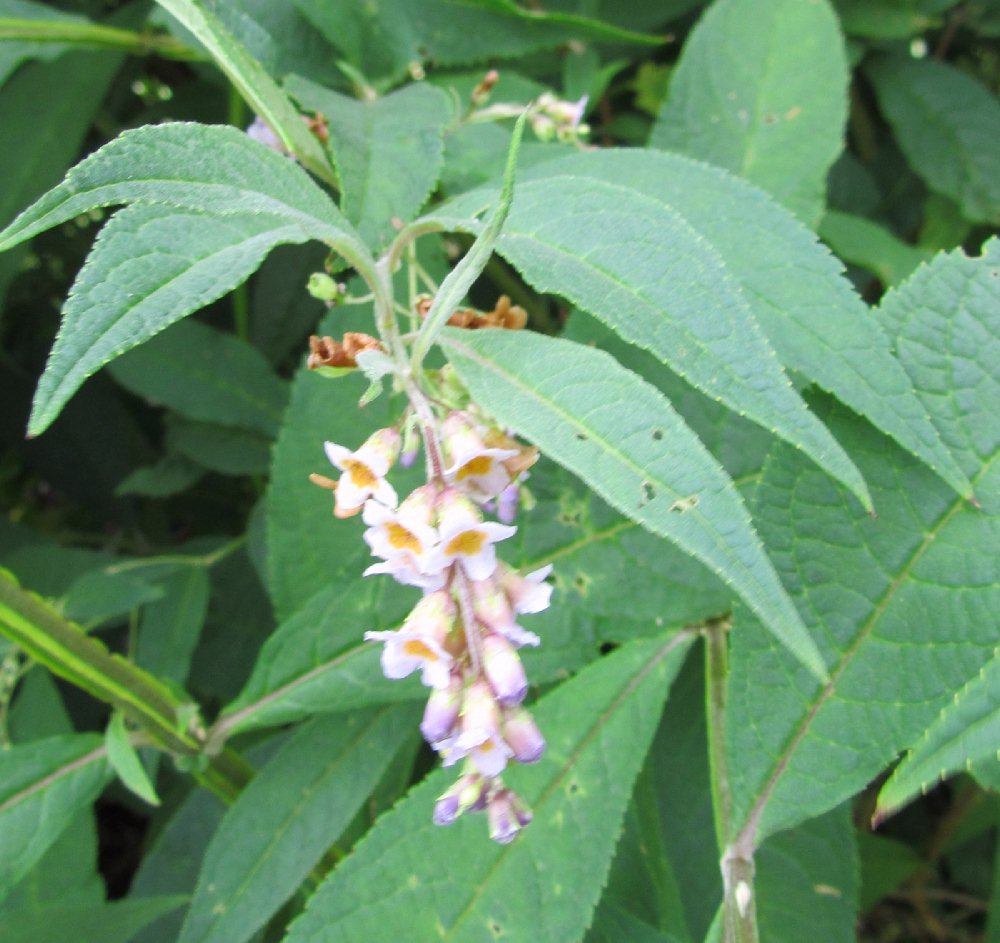
- Buddleja limitanea inflorescence

Scientific classification
- Kingdom: Plantae
- Clade: Tracheophytes
- Clade: Angiosperms
- Clade: Eudicots
- Clade: Asterids
- Order: Lamiales
- Family: Scrophulariaceae
- Genus: Buddleja
- Species: B. limitanea

Binomial name
- Buddleja limitanea W. W. Sm.

Synonyms
- Buddleja SP. ACE2522

= Buddleja limitanea =

Species of plant

Buddleja limitanea is a small deciduous shrub. Discovered by George Forrest in Yunnan (1912) and in northern Burma (1914), described by William Wright Smith in 1916. Resembling a small B. forrestii and hence sunk under this name by Leeuwenberg, although recognised in horticulture as a separate species.

== Description ==
Buddleja limitanea grows to two metres in height in the wild and has small pendulous terminal panicles with relatively few flowers. The colour of the virtually scentless flowers is generally pink-purple, which appear in late summer. The grey-green lanceolate leaves, which have only sparing tomentum, are opposite and considerably smaller than those of B. forrestii.

== Cultivation ==
Buddleja limitanea is fairly hardy in the UK, but still best grown against a south-facing wall, or in pots which can be removed to the greenhouse or conservatory in winter. Relatively common in cultivation in the UK, a specimen is grown as part of the NCCPG national collection at Longstock Park Nursery, near Stockbridge, Hampshire. Hardiness: USDA zones 8–9.
