= Buddleja 'Silver Frost' =

Flowering plant cultivar

Buddleja hybrid
- Cultivar: 'Silver Frost'
- Origin: University of Georgia, Athens, US

Buddleja 'Silver Frost' is a hybrid cultivar raised by Michael Dirr and his team at the University of Georgia, US, from a crossing of 'Lochinch' and an unnamed variety. 'Silver Frost' grows rapidly to a height of about 2.0 m and is distinguished by its silver-grey foliage allied with upright panicles of pure white flowers. As of 2013, 'Silver Frost' is only cultivated in the US and Canada. Hardiness: USDA zones 5–9.
