= Award of Merit =

The Award of Merit, or AM, is a mark of quality awarded to plants by the British Royal Horticultural Society (RHS). The award was instituted in 1888, and given on the recommendation of Plant Committees to plants deemed "of great merit for exhibition" i.e. for show, not garden, plants. A higher exhibition award is the First Class Certificate (FCC) given to plants "of outstanding excellence for exhibition".

The Award of Merit should not be confused with the Award of Garden Merit (AGM), given to plants of "outstanding excellence for garden decoration or use", i.e. to garden, greenhouse or house plants.
