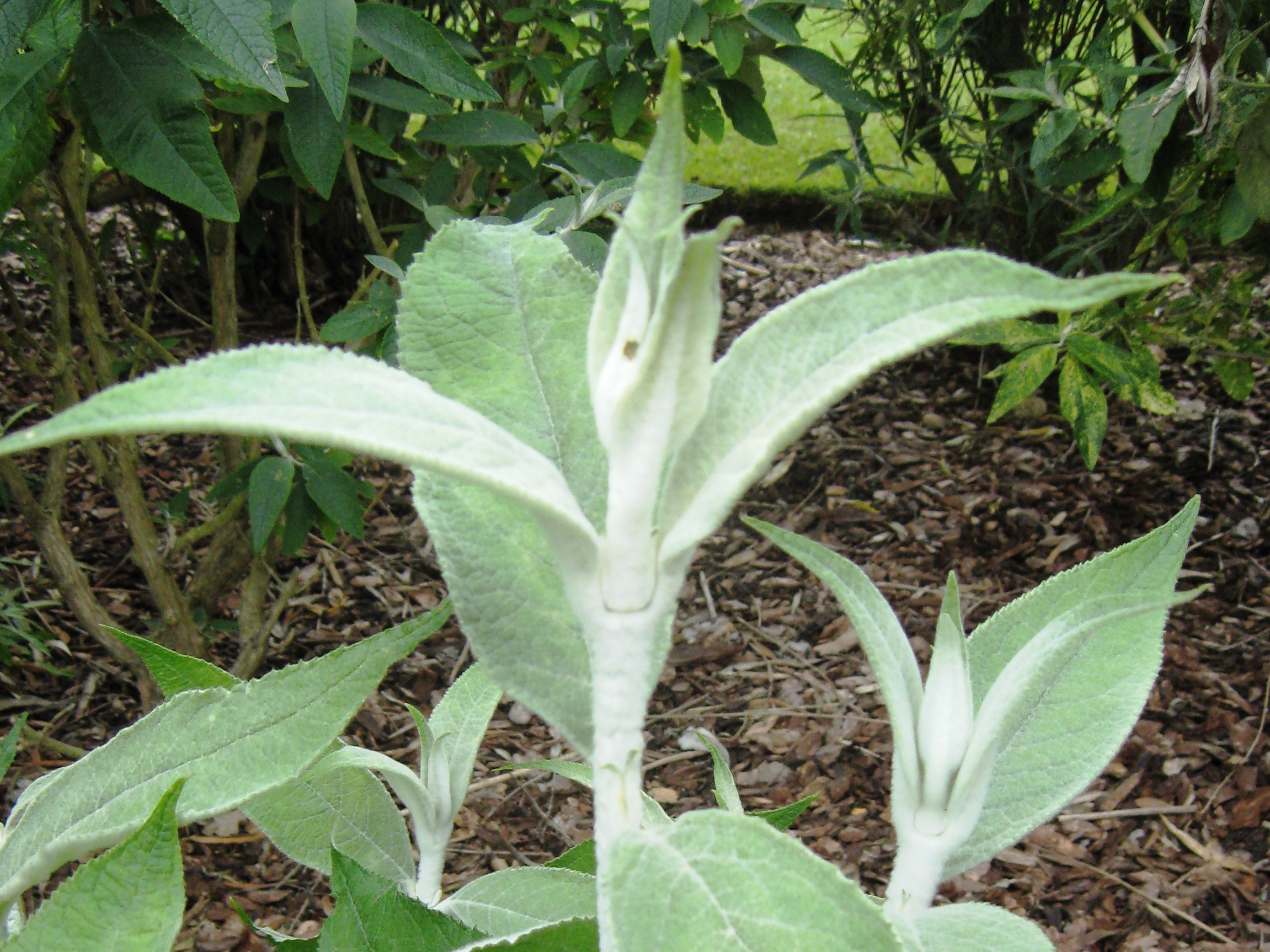
- Buddleja nivea foliage

Scientific classification
- Kingdom: Plantae
- Clade: Embryophytes
- Clade: Tracheophytes
- Clade: Spermatophytes
- Clade: Angiosperms
- Clade: Eudicots
- Clade: Asterids
- Order: Lamiales
- Family: Scrophulariaceae
- Genus: Buddleja
- Species: B. nivea

Binomial name
- Buddleja nivea Duthie

Synonyms
- Buddleja macrostachya Wallich ex Bentham var. yunnanensis (Dop) Rehder & Wilson; Buddleja nivea var. yunnanensis Rehder & Wilson; Buddleja stenostachya Rehder & Wilson

= Buddleja nivea =

Species of plant

Buddleja nivea is a vigorous shrub endemic to western China, evergreen in the wild, but deciduous in cultivation in the UK. The plant was discovered by Wilson in the Yangtze basin at altitudes of 700 – 3,600 m. Introduced to cultivation in 1901, it was named by Duthie in 1905. Several plants similar to the species but originally treated as species and varieties in their own right have now been sunk as B. nivea (see synonyms).

== Description ==
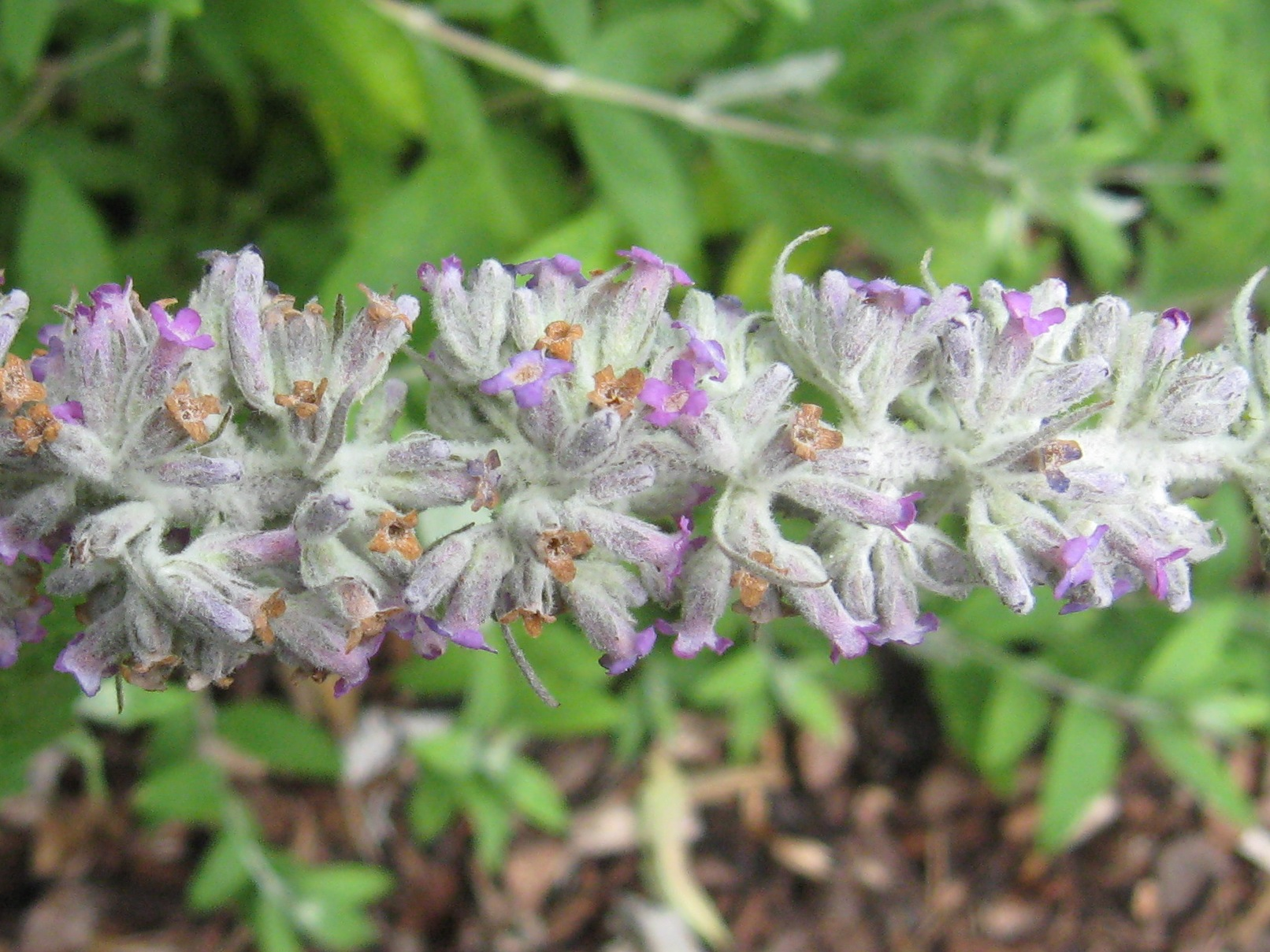
B. nivea inflorescence

Buddleja nivea reaches 1–3 m high, and is chiefly distinguished by the dense white indumentum covering the branchlets, calyxes, and undersides of the leaves. The lanceolate leaves are of variable size, 6–22 cm long by 1.5–11 cm wide; they are acute or acuminate at the apex, rounded at the base, and very coarsely toothed except at the apex. The insignificant, faintly-scented flowers have short corollas 6–8 mm long, with only the erect lobes visible above the indumentum. The flowers range in colour from pink to purple, and are arranged as narrow terminal panicles, < 25 cm long, appearing in summer. B. nivea is generally hexaploid (chromosome number 2n = 114), although plants identified as B. macrostachya may be hexaploid or dodecaploid (2n=228).

== Cultivation ==
The species is fairly common in cultivation in the UK as it is hardy to −15 °C. A large specimen is grown as part of the NCCPG National Collection held by Longstock Park Nursery near Stockbridge, Hampshire. Hardiness: USDA zones 7–8.

== Literature ==
- Duthie, J. F. (1905). Gard. Chron. ser. 3.38 : 275.
- Hillier & Sons. (1990), Hilliers' Manual of Trees & Shrubs, 5th ed. (1990). David & Charles, Newton Abbot.
- Krüssmann, G. (1984). Manual of Cultivated Broad-leaved Trees & Shrubs, Vol. 1. Engl. transl. London, 1984.
- Li, P. T. & Leeuwenberg, A. J. M. (1996). Loganiaceae, in Wu, Z. & Raven, P. (eds) Flora of China, Vol. 15. Science Press, Beijing, and Missouri Botanical Garden Press, St. Louis, USA. ISBN 978-0915279371 online at www.efloras.org
- Phillips, R. & Rix, M. (1989). Shrubs, Pan Books, London. ISBN 0-330-30258-2
