= Anthonius Josephus Maria Leeuwenberg =

Dutch botanist and taxonomist (1930–2010)

Anthonius Josephus Maria "Toon" Leeuwenberg (11 August 1930, in Amsterdam – 2010) was a Dutch botanist and taxonomist best known for his research into the genus Buddleja at the Laboratory of Plant Taxonomy and Plant Geography, Wageningen. He was responsible for sinking many Asiatic species, as varieties, notably within Buddleja crispa. In 1962, he worked with Jan de Wilde on the flora of the Ivory Coast.

== Selected publications ==
- Leeuwenberg, A. J. M. (1979). The Loganiaceae of Africa XVIII Buddleja L. II, Revision of the African & Asiatic species. H. Veenman & Zonen B. V., Wageningen, Nederland.
- Leeuwenberg, A. J. M. (1991). A Revision of Tabernaemontana: the old world species.
- Leeuwenberg, A. J. M. (1994). A Revision of Tabernaemontana 2: the new world species and Stemmadenia Revisions of Apocynaceae: 36
