= Apostille Convention =

1961 foreign document certification treaty

Convention of 5 October 1961 Abolishing the Requirement of Legalisation for Foreign Public Documents
- In force Acceded but not yet in force
- Signed: 5 October 1961
- Location: The Hague, Netherlands
- Effective: 24 January 1965
- Condition: Ratification by 3 signatories
- Parties: 130
- Depositary: Ministry of Foreign Affairs of the Netherlands
- Citations: 527 U.N.T.S. 189
- Languages: French (prevailing in case of divergence) and English

Full text
- Apostille Convention at Wikisource

The Convention of 5 October 1961 Abolishing the Requirement of Legalisation for Foreign Public Documents, also known as the Apostille Convention, is an international treaty drafted by the Hague Conference on Private International Law (HCCH). The Apostille Convention is intended to simplify the procedure through which a document, issued in one of the contracting states, can be certified for legal purposes in the other contracting states of the convention. A certification under the convention is called an apostille or Hague apostille (from French apostille, meaning a marginal or bottom note, derived from Latin post illa, meaning "after those [words of the text]"). An apostille is an international certification comparable to a notarisation, and may supplement a local notarisation of the document. If the convention applies between two states, an apostille issued by the state of origin is sufficient to certify the document, and removes the need for further certification by the destination state.

== Background ==
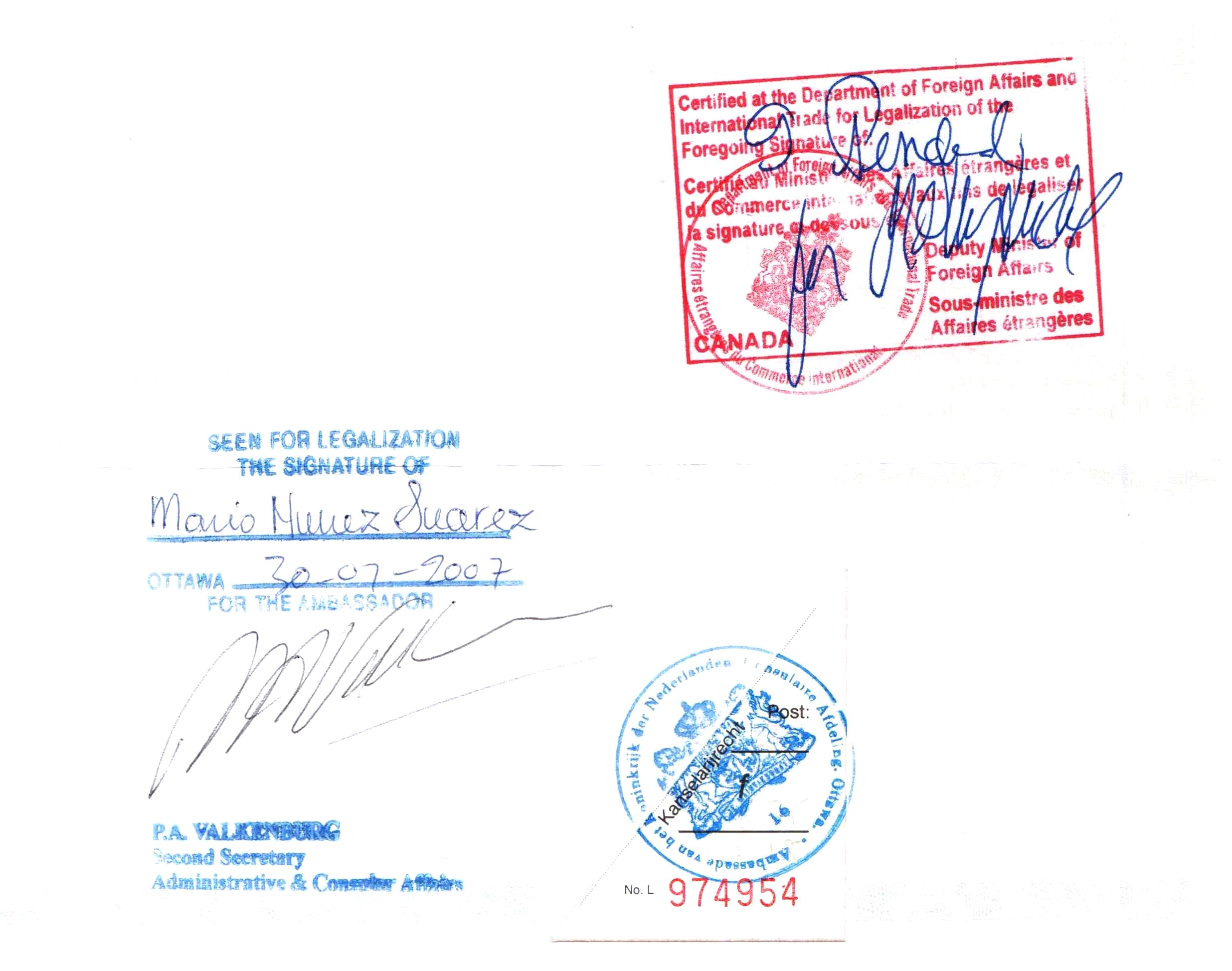
Legalisation of a Canadian document for use in the Netherlands (before Canada acceded to the Apostille Convention). This document was certified by the Canadian Department of Foreign Affairs and International Trade and subsequently by the Embassy of the Netherlands in Canada.

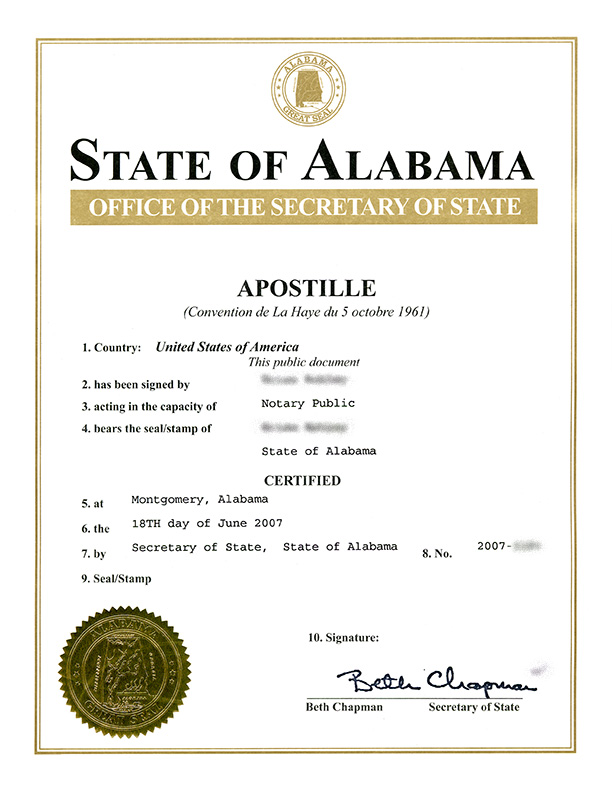
Apostille issued by the U.S. state of Alabama. This apostille is sufficient to certify the document for any state where the Apostille Convention is in force.

Many states require the verification of the authenticity of foreign documents, in a procedure called legalisation, for the document to be legally valid there. This legalisation is generally a chain of certifications, by one or more authorities of the state where the document was issued and of the destination state. The first authority certifies the issuer of the document, and each subsequent authority certifies the previous one, until the final certification is made by an authority of the destination state that can be recognised by the final user there. For example, to be accepted in Egypt, a document from the U.S. state of Maryland not issued by a government official must be certified by a notary public, who must then be certified by the clerk of the circuit court in the notary's county, who must then be certified by the Maryland Secretary of State, who must then be certified by the U.S. Department of State, which must finally be certified by the Embassy of Egypt in the United States.

In many cases, the legalisation procedure is simplified or exempted altogether. For example, some states have agreements eliminating the legalisation requirement for certain documents issued by each other, such as between Argentina and Italy, between Brazil and France, between parties of the Convention on the Issue of Multilingual Extracts from Civil Status Records, and between parties of the Convention on Legal Assistance and Legal Relations of the Commonwealth of Independent States. The European Union also has a regulation eliminating the legalisation requirement for certain documents of its member states to be accepted by each other. Some states such as Canada, Japan, South Africa, the United Kingdom and the United States generally accept documents from any state without any certification.

The Apostille Convention, drafted by the Hague Conference on Private International Law (HCCH), is intended to simplify the legalisation procedure by replacing it with a certification called an apostille, issued by an authority designated by the state of origin. Ideally the apostille would be the only certification needed, but in some cases additional certifications in the state of origin may be required before the apostille is issued. In any case, after the apostille, no certification by the destination state is required.

== Contracting states ==
The convention permits certain states to sign and ratify the convention, becoming contracting states. (Note: These states were those represented at the ninth session of the Hague Conference on Private International Law (Austria, Belgium, Denmark, Finland, France, Greece, Italy, Japan, Luxembourg, Netherlands, Norway, Portugal, Spain, Sweden, Switzerland, the United Kingdom, West Germany, and Yugoslavia), Iceland, Ireland, Liechtenstein, and Turkey.) For each of these states, or for an extension to one of its territories, the convention enters into force 60 days after the deposit of its ratification or territorial extension. Other states are also permitted to become contracting states by acceding to the convention, but without signing it. For each of these states, during the period of six months after it deposits its accession, the other contracting states may object to it, and the convention enters into force 60 days after this period, between the acceding state and all other contracting states that did not object to it. Later, if a contracting state withdraws its objection, the convention enters into force between these two states at that time. A successor state of a previous contracting state may declare to continue to be bound by the convention without a waiting period or accede later as a new state.

As of September 2026, 130 states are contracting states of the Apostille Convention.

State	Signed	Deposited	Entered into force
Albania (Note: The convention entered into force between Albania and the following contracting states on different dates: Belgium on 21 December 2015, Germany on 9 December 2016, Greece on 26 February 2018, Italy on 26 May 2011, and Spain on 7 February 2017.)	—	3 September 2003	9 May 2004
Algeria (Note: The convention is not in force between Algeria and the following contracting states: Austria, Germany, and Greece.)	—	5 November 2025	9 July 2026
Andorra	—	15 April 1996	31 December 1996
Antigua and Barbuda (Note: The United Kingdom extended the convention to the predecessor of this state effective 25 April 1965. Following its independence, the state declared itself to continue to be bound by the convention.)	—	1 May 1985	1 November 1981
Argentina (Note: Argentina objected to the extension of the convention by the United Kingdom to the Falkland Islands, South Georgia and the South Sandwich Islands, and the British Antarctic Territory.)	—	8 May 1987	18 February 1988
Armenia	—	19 November 1993	14 August 1994
Australia (Note: Australia extended the convention to all of its territories upon its accession.)	—	11 July 1994	16 March 1995
Austria (Note: Austria, Estonia, Finland, Germany, Latvia, Lithuania, Poland, Portugal, Romania and Ukraine declared that they would not accept documents issued under the convention by the Russian authorities in Crimea and Sevastopol. Poland and Ukraine also declared that they would not accept documents issued by the authorities of the Donetsk and Luhansk People's Republics.)	5 October 1961	14 November 1967	13 January 1968
Azerbaijan (Note: The convention entered into force between Azerbaijan and the following contracting states on different dates: Germany on 16 March 2026, Hungary on 10 March 2005, and the Netherlands on 10 August 2010.)	—	13 May 2004	2 March 2005
Bahamas	—	30 April 1976	10 July 1973
Bahrain	—	10 April 2013	31 December 2013
Bangladesh (Note: The convention is not in force between Bangladesh and the following contracting states: Argentina, Austria, Belgium, Czech Republic, Denmark, Estonia, Finland, France, Germany, Greece, Lithuania, and the Netherlands.)	—	29 July 2024	30 March 2025
Barbados	—	11 August 1995	30 November 1966
Belarus (Note: Belarus declared itself bound by the convention as one of the successor states of the Soviet Union.)	—	16 June 1992	31 May 1992
Belgium	10 March 1970	11 December 1975	9 February 1976
Belize	—	17 July 1992	11 April 1993
Bolivia	—	6 September 2017	7 May 2018
Bosnia and Herzegovina (Note: Yugoslavia signed the convention on 5 October 1961, ratified it on 25 September 1962, and it entered into force for Yugoslavia on 24 January 1965. Following its dissolution, the successor states of Bosnia and Herzegovina, Croatia, North Macedonia, Serbia and Montenegro, and Slovenia declared themselves bound by the convention. Following the dissolution of Serbia and Montenegro, the continuator state of Serbia and the successor state of Montenegro declared themselves bound by the convention.)	—	23 August 1993	6 March 1992
Botswana	—	16 September 1968	30 September 1966
Brazil	—	2 December 2015	14 August 2016
Brunei (Note: The United Kingdom extended the convention to the predecessor of this state effective 25 April 1965. Following its independence, the state did not declare to continue to be bound by the convention, but acceded to the convention at a later date.)	—	23 February 1987	3 December 1987
Bulgaria	—	1 August 2000	29 April 2001
Burundi (Note: The convention is not in force between Burundi and the following contracting states: Austria, Czech Republic, Germany, and Poland.)	—	10 June 2014	13 February 2015
Canada	—	12 May 2023	11 January 2024
Cape Verde (Note: Portugal extended the convention to all of its external territories on 21 December 1969. These territories included the predecessors of Cape Verde and São Tomé and Príncipe, which did not declare to continue to be bound by the convention following their independence but acceded to the convention at a later date, and of Angola, Guinea-Bissau, Mozambique and Timor-Leste, which have not declared to be bound to the convention following their independence or acceded to the convention.)	—	7 May 2009	13 February 2010
Chile	—	16 December 2015	30 August 2016
China (Note: Dates are for mainland China. The United Kingdom extended the convention to Hong Kong on 25 April 1965, Portugal extended it to Macau on 21 December 1969, and the convention remained in force in both territories following their respective transfer to China. The convention is not in force between mainland China and India.)	—	8 March 2023	7 November 2023
Colombia	—	27 April 2000	30 January 2001
Cook Islands	—	13 July 2004	30 April 2005
Costa Rica	—	6 April 2011	14 December 2011
Croatia	—	23 April 1993	8 October 1991
Cyprus	—	26 July 1972	30 April 1973
Czech Republic	—	23 June 1998	16 March 1999
Denmark (Note: Denmark extended the convention to the Faroe Islands effective 13 December 2021. It has not extended the convention to Greenland.)	20 October 2006	30 October 2006	29 December 2006
Dominica	—	22 October 2002	3 November 1978
Dominican Republic (Note: The convention is not in force between the Dominican Republic and Germany. The convention entered into force between the Dominican Republic and the following contracting states on different dates: Austria on 30 January 2023, Belgium on 8 March 2019, and the Netherlands on 3 November 2017.)	—	12 December 2008	30 August 2009
Ecuador	—	2 July 2004	2 April 2005
El Salvador	—	14 September 1995	31 May 1996
Estonia	—	11 December 2000	30 September 2001
Eswatini	—	3 July 1978	6 September 1968
Fiji	—	29 March 1971	10 October 1970
Finland	13 March 1962	27 June 1985	26 August 1985
France (Note: France extended the convention to all of its territories upon its ratification. These territories included the predecessors of Comoros and Djibouti, which have not declared to be bound to the convention following their independence or acceded to the convention.)	9 October 1961	25 November 1964	24 January 1965
Georgia (Note: The convention entered into force between Georgia and the following contracting states on different dates: Germany on 3 February 2010, and Greece on 17 December 2015. The convention does not apply to documents issued by Abkhazia and South Ossetia.)	—	21 August 2006	14 May 2007
Germany (Note: Germany ratified the convention as West Germany. Following its reunification with East Germany on 3 October 1990, it declared that the convention applied to the entire territory of Germany.)	5 October 1961	15 December 1965	13 February 1966
Greece	5 October 1961	19 March 1985	18 May 1985
Grenada	—	17 July 2001	7 April 2002
Guatemala	—	19 January 2017	18 September 2017
Guyana	—	30 July 2018	18 April 2019
Honduras	—	20 January 2004	30 September 2004
Hungary	—	18 April 1972	18 January 1973
Iceland	7 September 2004	28 September 2004	27 November 2004
India (Note: The convention is not in force between India and Germany. The convention entered into force between India and the following contracting states on different dates: Belgium on 9 January 2008, Finland on 5 October 2009, the Netherlands on 16 September 2008, and Spain on 12 February 2008.)	—	26 October 2004	14 July 2005
Indonesia	—	5 October 2021	4 June 2022
Ireland	29 October 1996	8 January 1999	9 March 1999
Israel	—	11 November 1977	14 August 1978
Italy	15 December 1961	13 December 1977	11 February 1978
Jamaica	—	2 November 2020	3 July 2021
Japan	12 March 1970	28 May 1970	27 July 1970
Kazakhstan	—	5 April 2000	30 January 2001
Kosovo (Note: The convention is not in force between Kosovo and the following contracting states: Argentina, Armenia, Austria, Azerbaijan, Belarus, Brazil, Chile, China, Cyprus, Ecuador, Georgia, Germany, Greece, India, Mauritius, Mexico, Moldova, Namibia, Nicaragua, Paraguay, Peru, Philippines, Romania, Russia, Serbia, Slovakia, Spain, Ukraine, Uzbekistan, and Venezuela. The convention entered into force between Kosovo and the following contracting states on different dates: Israel on 20 November 2024, and Poland on 1 March 2024.)	—	6 November 2015	14 July 2016
Kyrgyzstan (Note: The convention is not in force between Kyrgyzstan and the following contracting states: Austria and Greece. The convention entered into force between Kyrgyzstan and the following contracting states on different dates: Belgium on 11 June 2025, and Germany on 7 October 2024.)	—	15 November 2010	31 July 2011
Latvia	—	11 May 1995	30 January 1996
Lesotho	—	24 April 1972	4 October 1966
Liberia (Note: The convention is not in force between Liberia and the following contracting states: Belgium and Germany. The convention entered into force between Liberia and the United States on 20 May 2015.)	—	24 May 1995	8 February 1996
Liechtenstein	18 April 1962	19 July 1972	17 September 1972
Lithuania	—	5 November 1996	19 July 1997
Luxembourg	5 October 1961	4 April 1979	3 June 1979
Malawi	—	24 February 1967	2 December 1967
Malta	—	12 June 1967	3 March 1968
Marshall Islands	—	18 November 1991	14 August 1992
Mauritius	—	20 December 1968	12 March 1968
Mexico	—	1 December 1994	14 August 1995
Moldova (Note: The convention entered into force between Moldova and Germany on 17 July 2026.)	—	19 June 2006	16 March 2007
Monaco	—	24 April 2002	31 December 2002
Mongolia (Note: The convention is not in force between Mongolia and the following contracting states: Austria, Belgium, Finland, Germany, and Greece.)	—	2 April 2009	31 December 2009
Montenegro	—	30 January 2007	3 June 2006
Morocco (Note: The convention is not in force between Morocco and Germany.)	—	27 November 2015	14 August 2016
Namibia	—	25 April 2000	30 January 2001
Netherlands (Note: Dates are for the European part. The convention was extended to the Netherlands Antilles (predecessor of Aruba, Curaçao, Sint Maarten, as well as Bonaire, Sint Eustatius and Saba) from 30 April 1967.)	30 November 1962	9 August 1965	8 October 1965
New Zealand (Note: New Zealand has not extended the convention to Tokelau.)	—	7 February 2001	22 November 2001
Nicaragua	—	7 September 2012	14 May 2013
Niue	—	10 June 1998	2 March 1999
North Macedonia	—	20 September 1993	17 November 1991
Norway	30 May 1983	30 May 1983	29 July 1983
Oman	—	12 May 2011	30 January 2012
Pakistan (Note: The convention is not in force between Pakistan and the following contracting states: Austria, Czech Republic, Denmark, Finland, Germany, Greece, Netherlands, and Poland. Pakistan declared that its participation in the convention would not apply to India or to parties that it does not recognise as states, which would be Armenia until 31 August 2025 and Israel.)	—	8 July 2022	9 March 2023
Palau	—	17 October 2019	23 June 2020
Panama	—	30 October 1990	4 August 1991
Paraguay (Note: The convention entered into force between Paraguay and Germany on 6 January 2022.)	—	10 December 2013	30 August 2014
Peru (Note: The convention entered into force between Peru and the following contracting states on different dates: Germany on 1 January 2014, and Greece on 26 July 2024.)	—	13 January 2010	30 September 2010
Philippines (Note: The convention is not in force between the Philippines and Germany. The convention entered into force between the Philippines and the following contracting states on different dates: Austria on 1 June 2023, Finland on 22 August 2025, and Greece on 25 June 2024. The Philippines declared that its accession would not apply to contracting parties that it does not recognise as states, which is the case of Kosovo.)	—	12 September 2018	14 May 2019
Poland	—	19 November 2004	14 August 2005
Portugal	20 August 1965	6 December 1968	4 February 1969
Romania	—	7 June 2000	16 March 2001
Russia (Note: Russia declared itself bound by the convention as the continuator of the Soviet Union.)	—	4 September 1991	31 May 1992
Rwanda (Note: The convention is not in force between Rwanda and Germany.)	—	6 October 2023	5 June 2024
Saint Kitts and Nevis	—	26 February 1994	14 December 1994
Saint Lucia	—	5 December 2001	31 July 2002
Saint Vincent and the Grenadines	—	2 May 2002	27 October 1979
Samoa	—	18 January 1999	13 September 1999
San Marino	—	26 May 1994	13 February 1995
São Tomé and Príncipe	—	19 December 2007	13 September 2008
Saudi Arabia	—	8 April 2022	7 December 2022
Senegal (Note: The convention is not in force between Senegal and the following contracting states: Austria and Germany. The convention entered into force between Senegal and the Netherlands on 28 January 2026.)	—	13 July 2022	23 March 2023
Serbia	—	26 April 2001	27 April 1992
Seychelles	—	9 June 1978	31 March 1979
Singapore	—	18 January 2021	16 September 2021
Slovakia	—	6 June 2001	18 February 2002
Slovenia	—	8 June 1992	25 June 1991
South Africa	—	3 August 1994	30 April 1995
South Korea	—	25 October 2006	14 July 2007
Spain	21 October 1976	27 July 1978	25 September 1978
Suriname (Note: The Netherlands extended the convention to Suriname on 16 May 1967. Following its independence, Suriname declared itself to continue to be bound by the convention.)	—	29 October 1976	25 November 1975
Sweden	2 March 1999	2 March 1999	1 May 1999
Switzerland	5 October 1961	10 January 1973	11 March 1973
Tajikistan (Note: The convention is not in force between Tajikistan and the following contracting states: Austria, Belgium, and Germany.)	—	20 February 2015	31 October 2015
Thailand	—	30 June 2026	28 February 2027
Tonga	—	28 October 1971	4 June 1970
Trinidad and Tobago	—	28 October 1999	14 July 2000
Tunisia (Note: The convention is not in force between Tunisia and the following contracting states: Austria, Germany, and Greece. The convention entered into force between Tunisia and Belgium on 11 June 2025.)	—	10 July 2017	30 March 2018
Turkey	8 May 1962	31 July 1985	29 September 1985
Ukraine (Note: The convention entered into force between Ukraine and the following contracting states on different dates: Belgium on 5 July 2004 and Germany on 22 July 2010.)	—	2 April 2003	22 December 2003
United Kingdom (Note: The United Kingdom extended the convention, effective 24 January 1965, to the Crown dependencies of Guernsey, Isle of Man and Jersey, and effective 25 April 1965, to the British Overseas Territories of Anguilla, Bermuda, British Antarctic Territory, British Virgin Islands, Cayman Islands, Falkland Islands (including the South Georgia and the South Sandwich Islands, which later became a separate territory and continued to apply the convention), Gibraltar, Montserrat, Saint Helena, Ascension and Tristan da Cunha, and Turks and Caicos Islands, as well as to the predecessors of several states. These states declared themselves to continue to be bound to the convention following their independence or later acceded to the convention, except for Kiribati (gained independence on 12 July 1979), the Solomon Islands (7 July 1978), Tuvalu (1 October 1978), and Zimbabwe (18 April 1980).)	19 October 1961	21 August 1964	24 January 1965
United States (Note: The United States has not declared territorial extensions but it has designated competent authorities in all of its permanently inhabited territories.)	—	24 December 1980	15 October 1981
Uruguay	—	9 February 2012	14 October 2012
Uzbekistan (Note: The convention is not in force between Uzbekistan and the following contracting states: Austria, Germany, and Greece. The convention entered into force between Uzbekistan and Belgium on 11 June 2025.)	—	25 July 2011	15 April 2012
Vanuatu (Note: France and the United Kingdom extended the convention to the New Hebrides effective 15 February 1966. Following its independence, Vanuatu declared itself to continue to be bound by the convention.)	—	1 August 2008	30 July 1980
Venezuela	—	1 July 1998	16 March 1999
Vietnam (Note: The convention is not in force between Vietnam and the following contracting states: Austria, Czech Republic, and Germany.)	—	31 December 2025	11 September 2026

=== Potential accessions ===
The governments of Iran, Lebanon and Malaysia have expressed interest in acceding to the Apostille Convention.

In May 2025, the government of Indonesia recommended that Malaysia and Egypt accede to the convention.

In June 2026, the parliament of The Gambia approved a motion to consider acceding to the convention.

== Procedure ==
=== Eligible documents ===
The convention mentions four types of documents eligible for apostilles:

- court documents
- administrative documents (e.g. vital records)
- notarial acts
- official certificates which are placed on documents signed by persons in their private capacity, such as official certificates recording the registration of a document or the fact that it was in existence on a certain date and official and notarial authentications of signatures.

However, the Apostille Convention does not apply to documents issued by diplomatic or consular officers, or to administrative documents dealing directly with commercial or customs operations. The reason for this exclusion is that these documents are usually already exempt from legalisation.

=== Competent authorities ===
Each contracting state designates one or more authorities to issue apostilles. Examples of designated authorities are ministries, courts, subnational governments, notaries and registries. In some states, each authority is designated to issue apostilles only on certain types of documents. For example, in Hungary, apostilles are issued on court documents by the Ministry of Justice, on notarial documents by the Chamber of Civil Law Notaries, and on other documents by the Ministry of Foreign Affairs; in Mexico, apostilles on federal documents are issued by the federal Secretariat of Governance, and on state documents by the respective state government. In South Africa, the Department of International Relations and Cooperation (DIRCO) issues apostilles for public documents, while the High Court issues apostilles for notarised private documents.

In general, documents issued by a government official can be certified directly with an apostille, while other documents must be certified by a notary, who may then be certified with an apostille. In some cases, additional intermediate certifications may be required; for example, for notarised or municipal documents in some U.S. states, the notary or municipal official must be certified by the respective county or court, which may then be certified by the respective state with an apostille.

=== Cost ===
The fee for issuing an apostille varies widely by state. In 2016, the HCCH compiled fees of 54 states and calculated an average of 15.43 EUR. Some states, such as Italy and Japan, do not charge a fee, while the Cayman Islands charge 150 KYD (180 USD), one of the highest. In some states, the fee also varies by location, authority, quantity, purpose or type of document. For example, in the United States, Indiana does not charge a fee for an apostille of a birth certificate, while Connecticut charges 40 USD for an apostille not related to adoption.

Apostille authorities and fees by state, as of 2026
State	Authority	Fee			Notes
State	Authority	In local currency	EUR	USD	Notes
Albania	Ministry for Europe and Foreign Affairs	200 ALL	2.17	2.53	200 ALL for Albanian nationals; 3 to 80 EUR for foreign nationals.
Algeria	Ministry of the Interior, Local Authorities and Transport	1,500 DZD	9.71	11.28	For documents from this ministry and its institutions.
Algeria	District governments	1,500 DZD	9.71	11.28	For civil status documents.
Algeria	General prosecutor offices at courts of appeal	1,500 DZD	9.71	11.28	For judicial documents.
Algeria	Ministry of Higher Education and Scientific Research and universities	1,500 DZD	9.71	11.28	For higher education documents.
Algeria	Ministry of National Education, its institutions and provincial directorates	1,500 DZD	9.71	11.28	For primary, middle and secondary education documents.
Algeria	Ministry of Vocational Training and Education and its provincial directorates	1,500 DZD	9.71	11.28	For vocational education documents.
Andorra	Ministry of Foreign Affairs	8.58 EUR	8.58	9.97	
Antigua and Barbuda	Registry of the High Court	35 XCD	11.16	12.96	May also be paid as 12 GBP, 15 USD, 15 CAD or 15 EUR.
Argentina (Note: Notarial documents may be apostilled directly by the respective notarial college, or certified by the respective notarial college and then apostilled by the Ministry of Foreign Affairs or another notarial college. University documents must be certified by the national Ministry of Education, and other educational documents must be certified by the Ministry of Education of the respective province, before an apostille is requested from the Ministry of Foreign Affairs or any notarial college. Other documents with physical signatures may be apostilled directly by the notarial college of the respective jurisdiction, or certified by the Ministry of the Interior and then apostilled by the Ministry of Foreign Affairs or another notarial college. Other documents with digital signatures may be apostilled directly by the Ministry of Foreign Affairs or any notarial college. The Ministry of the Interior does not charge a fee for certification. The fees charged by notarial colleges include the fee of the Ministry of Foreign Affairs.)	Ministry of Foreign Affairs, International Trade and Worship	4,500 ARS	2.57	2.98	
Argentina	College of Notaries of the City of Buenos Aires	46,400 ARS	26.46	30.73	
Argentina	College of Notaries of Buenos Aires Province	28,000 ARS	15.97	18.54	
Argentina	College of Notaries of Catamarca	29,500 ARS	16.82	19.54	29,500 ARS normal or 44,500 ARS urgent, for documents from this province; 39,500 ARS normal or 49,500 ARS urgent, for documents from other jurisdictions.
Argentina	College of Notaries of Chaco	33,000 ARS	18.82	21.85	13,000 ARS normal, 17,500 ARS urgent or 42,000 ARS express, plus 20,000 ARS for digital legalisation or 25,000 for paper legalisation, for notarial documents; 19,500 ARS normal, 26,500 ARS urgent or 50,000 ARS express, for administrative documents.
Argentina	College of Notaries of Chubut	42,500 ARS	24.23	28.15	42,500 ARS normal or 65,000 ARS urgent.
Argentina	College of Notaries of Córdoba	44,500 ARS	25.37	29.47	44,500 ARS normal or 74,700 ARS urgent, for notarial documents; 43,700 ARS normal or 86,700 ARS urgent, for judicial and administrative documents.
Argentina	College of Notaries of Corrientes	20,500 ARS	11.69	13.58	20,500 ARS normal or 33,500 ARS urgent.
Argentina	College of Notaries of Entre Ríos	40,000 ARS	22.81	26.49	40,000 ARS normal or 60,000 ARS urgent.
Argentina	College of Notaries of Formosa				
Argentina	College of Notaries of Jujuy	34,500 ARS	19.67	22.85	34,500 ARS normal or 54,500 ARS urgent.
Argentina	College of Notaries of La Pampa	29,500 ARS	16.82	19.54	
Argentina	College of Notaries of La Rioja	23,500 ARS	13.40	15.56	23,500 ARS for 2-day service or 39,500 ARS for 1-day service, for documents from this province; 44,500 ARS for 3-day service or 64,500 ARS for 1-day service, for documents from other jurisdictions.
Argentina	Notarial College of Mendoza	35,000 ARS	19.96	23.18	35,000 ARS for 3-day service or 62,000 ARS for 1-day service.
Argentina	Notarial College of Misiones	31,400 ARS	17.90	20.79	31,400 ARS for 10-day service, 62,800 ARS for 5-day service, or 94,000 ARS for next-day service, for notarial documents; 38,500 ARS for 10-day service, 77,000 ARS for 5-day service, or 115,700 ARS for next-day service, for judicial and administrative documents.
Argentina	College of Notaries of Neuquén				
Argentina	Notarial College of Río Negro	33,300 ARS	18.99	22.05	33,300 ARS for 7-day service or 45,500 ARS for 2-day service.
Argentina	College of Notaries of Salta	46,500 ARS	26.51	30.79	46,500 ARS for 7-day service or 66,500 ARS for 2-day service.
Argentina	Notarial College of San Juan				
Argentina	College of Notaries of San Luis	33,000 ARS	18.82	21.85	33,000 ARS for 5-day service or 60,000 ARS for 1-day service.
Argentina	College of Notaries of Santa Cruz	35,000 ARS	19.96	23.18	35,000 ARS normal or 55,000 ARS urgent.
Argentina	College of Notaries of Santa Fe First District	32,800 ARS	18.70	21.72	
Argentina	College of Notaries of Santa Fe Second District	32,800 ARS	18.70	21.72	32,800 ARS normal or 79,400 ARS urgent.
Argentina	Notarial College of Santiago del Estero				
Argentina	College of Notaries of Tierra del Fuego	43,500 ARS	24.80	28.81	43,500 ARS normal or 76,000 ARS urgent.
Argentina	College of Notaries of Tucumán	40,000 ARS	22.81	26.49	
Armenia	Ministry of Justice	7,000 AMD	16.51	19.18	For documents submitted in Armenia, except criminal records.
Armenia	Ministry of Foreign Affairs	7,000 AMD	16.51	19.18	For documents submitted in diplomatic missions and criminal records.
Australia	Department of Foreign Affairs and Trade	105 AUD	64.58	75.00	
Austria	Federal Ministry for European and International Affairs	24.20 EUR	24.20	28.11	For federal administrative and supreme judicial documents. Additional 21 EUR per request if made by post.
Austria	Office of the Government of Burgenland	24.20 EUR	24.20	28.11	For administrative documents from this state. Fee is 25.40 EUR for citizenship documents or 24.20 EUR for other documents.
Austria	Office of the Government of Carinthia	24.20 EUR	24.20	28.11	For administrative documents from this state. Fee is 27 EUR for citizenship documents or 24.20 EUR for other documents.
Austria	Office of the Government of Lower Austria	24.20 EUR	24.20	28.11	For administrative documents from this state. Fee is 25.15 EUR for citizenship documents or 24.20 EUR for other documents. Additional 21 EUR per request if made by post.
Austria	Office of the Government of Salzburg	24.20 EUR	24.20	28.11	For administrative documents from this state. Fee is 48 EUR for citizenship documents or 24.20 EUR for other documents. Additional 21 EUR per request if made by post.
Austria	Office of the Government of Styria	24.20 EUR	24.20	28.11	For administrative documents from this state. Fee is 27.20 EUR for citizenship documents or 24.20 EUR for other documents. Additional 21 EUR per request if made by post.
Austria	Office of the Government of Tyrol	24.20 EUR	24.20	28.11	For administrative documents from this state. Fee is 27 EUR for citizenship documents or 24.20 EUR for other documents.
Austria	Office of the Government of Upper Austria	24.20 EUR	24.20	28.11	For administrative documents from this state. Fee is 27 EUR for citizenship documents or 24.20 EUR for other documents.
Austria	Office of the Government of Vienna	24.20 EUR	24.20	28.11	For administrative documents from this state.
Austria	Office of the Government of Vorarlberg	24.20 EUR	24.20	28.11	For administrative documents from this state. Fee is 26.20 EUR for citizenship documents or 24.20 EUR for other documents. Additional 21 EUR per request if made by post.
Austria	Regional courts	18 EUR	18.00	20.91	For judicial and notarial documents from the respective region.
Austria	Embassies and consulates	40 EUR	40.00	46.46	
Azerbaijan	Ministry of Justice	10 AZN	5.06	5.88	For judicial, notarial and civil registry documents.
Azerbaijan	Ministry of Foreign Affairs	10 AZN	5.06	5.88	For other documents.
Bahamas	Ministry of Foreign Affairs	100 BSD	86.10	100.00	100 BSD for standard service, 150 BSD for same-day service, or 300 BSD for 2-hour service, per document, plus 20 BSD for uniting and sealing.
Bahrain	Ministry of Foreign Affairs	20 BHD	45.80	53.19	2 BHD for educational or medical documents of Bahraini nationals, 10 BHD for educational or medical documents of foreign nationals or death certificates of Bahraini nationals, 20 BHD for other personal documents, or 40 BHD for commercial documents.
Bangladesh	Ministry of Foreign Affairs	–	0.00	0.00	1,000 BDT for medical educational documents of foreign students, 300 BDT for medical technology, medical faculty or nursing educational documents, 200 BDT for other educational documents, no fee for other documents.
Barbados	Solicitor General and Deputy Solicitor General	50 BBD	21.53	25.00	
Barbados	Registry of the Supreme Court	50 BBD	21.53	25.00	
Barbados	Corporate Affairs and Intellectual Property Office	50 BBD	21.53	25.00	
Barbados	Ministry of Foreign Affairs and Foreign Trade	50 BBD	21.53	25.00	
Belarus	Regional justice administrations	225 BYN	63.73	74.01	For judicial and notarial documents.
Belarus	Ministry of Education	225 BYN	63.73	74.01	For educational documents.
Belarus	Department for Archives and Records Management	225 BYN	63.73	74.01	For state archives.
Belarus	Ministry of Foreign Affairs	225 BYN	63.73	74.01	For other documents, and any documents submitted in diplomatic missions.
Belgium	Federal Public Service Foreign Affairs	20 EUR	20.00	23.23	
Belize	General Registry	50 BZD	21.53	25.00	
Belize	Financial Services Commission				
Bolivia	Ministry of Foreign Affairs	70 BOB	8.72	10.13	70, 130 or 300 BOB depending on the type of document, or 1,000 BOB for ADSIB certificate.
Bosnia and Herzegovina	Municipal and basic courts	20 BAM	10.23	11.88	
Botswana	Permanent Secretaries				
Botswana	District Commissioners				
Botswana	Registry of the High Court				
Botswana	Magistrate courts				
Brazil (Note: Documents from anywhere in Brazil may be apostilled by any notary or registry office authorised by the National Council of Justice. The fee is composed of various amounts and surcharges set for the state or Federal District where the office is located, and a tax between 2 and 5% may be added to the fee depending on the municipality or district. Due to variations in how each office calculates the surcharges and tax and whether it forwards them to the user, the total fee listed in this table for each state may not be exactly the same in all offices there.)	General Inspectorates of Justice and court directors				Only for judicial documents.
Brazil	Notaries and registries in Acre	69.80 BRL	11.78	13.69	
Brazil	Notaries and registries in Alagoas	97.08 BRL	16.39	19.04	
Brazil	Notaries and registries in Amapá	78.45 BRL	13.24	15.38	
Brazil	Notaries and registries in Amazonas	77.30 BRL	13.05	15.16	
Brazil	Notaries and registries in Bahia	118.58 BRL	20.02	23.25	
Brazil	Notaries and registries in Ceará	73.88 BRL	12.47	14.49	
Brazil	Notaries and registries in Espírito Santo	80.67 BRL	13.62	15.82	
Brazil	Notaries and registries in the Federal District	66.42 BRL	11.21	13.02	
Brazil	Notaries and registries in Goiás	95.92 BRL	16.19	18.81	
Brazil	Notaries and registries in Maranhão	140.01 BRL	23.64	27.45	
Brazil	Notaries and registries in Mato Grosso	138.35 BRL	23.36	27.13	
Brazil	Notaries and registries in Mato Grosso do Sul	120.59 BRL	20.36	23.65	
Brazil	Notaries and registries in Minas Gerais	189.38 BRL	31.97	37.13	
Brazil	Notaries and registries in Pará	146.83 BRL	24.79	28.79	Plus 29.80 BRL per sheet after the first sheet.
Brazil	Notaries and registries in Paraíba	85.17 BRL	14.38	16.70	
Brazil	Notaries and registries in Paraná	71.57 BRL	12.08	14.03	
Brazil	Notaries and registries in Pernambuco	123.08 BRL	20.78	24.13	
Brazil	Notaries in Piauí	209.25 BRL	35.33	41.03	138.36 BRL per request plus 70.89 BRL per document.
Brazil	Registries in Piauí	86.90 BRL	14.67	17.04	
Brazil	Notaries and registries in Rio de Janeiro	162.43 BRL	27.42	31.85	
Brazil	Notaries and registries in Rio Grande do Norte	99.70 BRL	16.83	19.55	
Brazil	Notaries and registries in Rio Grande do Sul	92.22 BRL	15.57	18.08	
Brazil	Notaries and registries in Rondônia	52.79 BRL	8.91	10.35	Plus 6.67 BRL for documents from outside the municipality.
Brazil	Notaries and registries in Roraima	74.39 BRL	12.56	14.59	
Brazil	Notaries and registries in Santa Catarina	70.43 BRL	11.89	13.81	
Brazil	Notaries and registries in São Paulo	164.14 BRL	27.71	32.18	
Brazil	Notaries and registries in Sergipe	93.59 BRL	15.80	18.35	
Brazil	Registries of natural persons in Tocantins	64.29 BRL	10.85	12.61	
Brazil	Notaries and other registries in Tocantins	85.34 BRL	14.41	16.73	
Brunei	Registry of the Supreme Court	2 BND	1.36	1.57	
Brunei	Registry of subordinate courts	2 BND	1.36	1.57	
Bulgaria	Ministry of Justice	2.56 EUR	2.56	2.97	For judicial and notarial documents.
Bulgaria	Provincial governments	2.56 EUR	2.56	2.97	For municipal documents.
Bulgaria	National Center for Information and Documentation	3.83 EUR	3.83	4.45	For educational and professional documents. Fee is 3.83 EUR for apostille issued electronically; 7.67 EUR if requested electronically but issued on paper, or requested on paper with 3-day service; 11.50 EUR if requested on paper with 2-day service; or 15.34 EUR if requested on paper with 8-hour service.
Bulgaria	Ministry of Foreign Affairs	2.56 EUR	2.56	2.97	For other documents.
Burundi	Ministry of Foreign Affairs and Development Cooperation				
Canada	Global Affairs Canada	–	0.00	0.00	For documents from the federal government, Atlantic provinces, Manitoba, and territories.
Canada	Ministry of Justice of Alberta	25 CAD	15.60	18.12	For documents from this province.
Canada	Ministry of the Attorney General of British Columbia	20 CAD	12.48	14.49	For documents from this province.
Canada	Ministry of Public and Business Service Delivery of Ontario	32 CAD	19.97	23.19	For documents from this province. Fee is 16 CAD for notarial documents or 32 CAD for other documents.
Canada	Ministry of Justice of Quebec	66.50 CAD	41.49	48.19	For documents from this province.
Canada	Ministry of Justice and Attorney General of Saskatchewan	50 CAD	31.20	36.23	For documents from this province.
Cape Verde	General Directorate of Registries, Notary and Identification	800 CVE	7.26	8.43	Fee may be waived due to financial hardship.
Cape Verde	General Directorate of Consular Affairs and Migrations	800 CVE	7.26	8.43	May also be paid as 8 EUR. Fee may be waived due to financial hardship.
Chile	Ministry of Justice and Human Rights	–	0.00	0.00	For judicial and notarial documents.
Chile	Ministry of Education	–	0.00	0.00	For educational documents.
Chile	Ministry of Health	–	0.00	0.00	For medical documents.
Chile	Civil Registry and Identification Service	–	0.00	0.00	For civil registry documents.
Chile	Ministry of Foreign Affairs	–	0.00	0.00	
China	Ministry of Foreign Affairs	50 CNY	6.42	7.45	For documents from mainland China. Fee is 50 CNY for personal documents or 100 CNY for commercial documents, for 4-day service; additional fee of 50 CNY for 2-day service.
China	Anhui Foreign Affairs Office				For documents from this province.
China	Chongqing Foreign Affairs Office	50 CNY	6.42	7.45	For documents from this municipality. Fee is 50 CNY for personal documents or 100 CNY for commercial documents, for 5-day service; additional fee of 50 CNY for 3-day service.
China	Fujian Foreign Affairs Office				For documents from this province.
China	Gansu Foreign Affairs Office				For documents from this province.
China	Guangdong Foreign Affairs Office				For documents from this province.
China	Guangxi Foreign Affairs Office				For documents from this region.
China	Guizhou Foreign Affairs Office				For documents from this province.
China	Hainan Foreign Affairs Office				For documents from this province.
China	Hebei Foreign Affairs Office	50 CNY	6.42	7.45	For documents from this province. Fee is 50 CNY for personal documents or 100 CNY for commercial documents, for 4-day service; additional fee of 50 CNY for 2-day service.
China	Heilongjiang Foreign Affairs Office				For documents from this province.
China	Henan Foreign Affairs Office	50 CNY	6.42	7.45	For documents from this province. Fee is 50 CNY for personal documents or 100 CNY for commercial documents, for 4-day service; additional fee of 50 CNY for 2-day service.
China	Hubei Foreign Affairs Office				For documents from this province.
China	Hunan Foreign Affairs Office				For documents from this province.
China	Inner Mongolia Foreign Affairs Office	50 CNY	6.42	7.45	For documents from this region. Fee is 50 CNY for personal documents or 100 CNY for commercial documents.
China	Jiangsu Foreign Affairs Office	50 CNY	6.42	7.45	For documents from this province. Fee is 50 CNY for personal documents or 100 CNY for commercial documents, for 4-day service; additional fee of 50 CNY for 2-day service.
China	Jiangxi Foreign Affairs Office				For documents from this province.
China	Jilin Foreign Affairs Office				For documents from this province.
China	Liaoning Foreign Affairs Office				For documents from this province.
China	Shaanxi Foreign Affairs Office				For documents from this province.
China	Shandong Foreign Affairs Office				For documents from this province.
China	Shanghai Foreign Affairs Office				For documents from this municipality.
China	Shanxi Foreign Affairs Office				For documents from this province.
China	Sichuan Foreign Affairs Office				For documents from this province.
China	Yunnan Foreign Affairs Office				For documents from this province.
China	Zhejiang Foreign Affairs Office				For documents from this province.
China	Changchun Foreign Affairs Office				For documents from this city.
China	Harbin Foreign Affairs Office				For documents from this city.
China	Jinan Foreign Affairs Office				For documents from this city.
China	Ningbo Foreign Affairs Office				For documents from this city.
China	Qingdao Foreign Affairs Office				For documents from this city.
China	Shenzhen Foreign Affairs Office				For documents from this city.
China	Registry of the High Court of Hong Kong	125 HKD	13.80	16.03	For documents from this region.
China	Secretariat for Administration and Justice of Macau	–	0.00	0.00	For documents from this region.
Colombia	Ministry of Foreign Affairs	36,000 COP	10.00	11.61	In consulates, may also be paid as 8 EUR or 11 USD. Plus 2,380 COP if paid by credit card.
Cook Islands	Ministry of Foreign Affairs and Immigration	20 NZD	10.01	11.63	
Costa Rica	Ministry of Foreign Affairs and Worship	500 CRC	0.95	1.11	
Croatia	Municipal courts	6.64 EUR	6.64	7.71	6.64 EUR for original documents; 7.96 EUR for translations.
Cyprus	Ministry of Justice and Public Order	5 EUR	5.00	5.81	
Czech Republic	Ministry of Justice	600 CZK	24.72	28.71	For judicial documents.
Czech Republic	Notarial Chamber	726 CZK	29.91	34.74	For notarial documents. Fee includes value added tax of 21%.
Czech Republic	Ministry of Foreign Affairs	600 CZK	24.72	28.71	For other documents.
Denmark	Ministry of Foreign Affairs	250 DKK	33.51	38.92	
Dominica	Ministry of National Security and Legal Affairs	15 USD	12.92	15.00	Equivalent to 40.50 XCD.
Dominican Republic	Ministry of Foreign Affairs	620 DOP	9.08	10.54	Scholarship documents, child custody sentences and ministry collaborators are exempt from the fee. Additional fee of 100 DOP for consular documents.
Ecuador	Ministry of Foreign Affairs and Human Mobility	30 USD	25.83	30.00	For applicants over age 65, the fee is reduced to 15 USD. Disabled applicants are exempt from the fee.
El Salvador	Ministry of Foreign Affairs	–	0.00	0.00	
Estonia	Notaries	27.71 EUR	27.71	32.18	Including value added tax of 24%.
Eswatini	Ministry of Foreign Affairs and International Cooperation				
Fiji	Ministry of Foreign Affairs and International Cooperation				
Finland	Digital and Population Data Services Agency	38 EUR	38.00	44.13	
France	Regional councils and interdepartmental chambers of notaries	12 EUR	12.00	13.94	For documents from the regions of France, Saint Barthélemy, Saint Martin, and Saint Pierre and Miquelon. Fee is 12 EUR for individuals or 24 EUR for companies, including value added tax of 20%, for each of the first 3 documents, for 3-day service; fee is halved for each additional document, and doubled for 1-day service.
France	Courts of appeal	–	0.00	0.00	For documents from the respective court area in French Polynesia, French Southern and Antarctic Lands, New Caledonia, and for mutual judicial assistance in criminal matters.
France	Court of first instance of Mata Utu	–	0.00	0.00	For documents from Wallis and Futuna.
Georgia	Service Agency	20 GEL	6.62	7.69	For criminal records and driving licenses. Fee is 20 GEL for 5-day service, or 50 GEL for 1-day service, plus 20 GEL for translation.
Georgia	National Center for Educational Quality Enhancement	30 GEL	9.93	11.54	For educational documents. Fee is 30 GEL for 8-day service, 60 GEL for 4-day service, or 120 GEL for 2-day service.
Georgia	Public Service Development Agency	30 GEL	9.93	11.54	For other documents. Fee is 30 GEL for 8-day service, 60 GEL for 4-day service, 120 GEL for 2-day service, or 150 GEL for same-day service, if applied in person in Georgia; 50 GEL if applied with electronic signature, or 55 GEL if applied by video, for 3-day service; 10 USD if applied at a consulate, for 8-day service; plus 30 GEL per page for translation in Georgia or 10 USD at a consulate.
Germany	Federal Foreign Office	25 EUR	25.00	29.04	For federal documents, except patents.
Germany	German Patent and Trade Mark Office	25 EUR	25.00	29.04	For patents.
Germany	State Ministries of Justice and courts	25 EUR	25.00	29.04	For judicial and notarial documents from the respective state or court area.
Germany	Ministry of Education, Youth and Sports of Baden-Württemberg	13 EUR	13.00	15.10	For school documents from this state.
Germany	Ministry of Science, Research and Arts of Baden-Württemberg	13 EUR	13.00	15.10	For university documents from this state.
Germany	Regional councils of Baden-Württemberg	25 EUR	25.00	29.04	For administrative documents from the respective region. Fee is 25 EUR for individuals or 50 EUR for companies. No fee for adoption documents.
Germany	Regional governments of Bavaria	20 EUR	20.00	23.23	For administrative documents from the respective region.
Germany	State Office for Civil and Regulatory Affairs of Berlin	19 EUR	19.00	22.07	For administrative documents from this state.
Germany	Ministry of the Interior of Brandenburg	31 EUR	31.00	36.00	For administrative documents from this state.
Germany	Senator for the Interior and Sport of Bremen	20 EUR	20.00	23.23	For administrative documents from this state.
Germany	Department of the Interior and Sport of Hamburg	16 EUR	16.00	18.58	For administrative documents from this state. Fee is 16 EUR if collected in person, or 39 EUR by mail.
Germany	Regional councils of Hesse	25 EUR	25.00	29.04	For administrative documents from the respective region.
Germany	Police departments of Lower Saxony	25 EUR	25.00	29.04	For administrative documents from the respective department area.
Germany	Ministry of the Interior of Mecklenburg-Western Pomerania	15 EUR	15.00	17.42	For administrative documents from this state. Fee is 12 EUR per document if the request is for multiple documents.
Germany	Regional Government of Arnsberg	25 EUR	25.00	29.04	For administrative documents from this region. Fee is 25 to 75 EUR.
Germany	Regional Government of Cologne	25 EUR	25.00	29.04	For administrative documents from this region. Fee is 25 to 50 EUR, or 10 EUR for copies, for individuals; 40 to 70 EUR, or 20 EUR for copies, for businesses.
Germany	Regional Government of Detmold	30 EUR	30.00	34.84	For administrative documents from this region. Fee is 30 to 40 EUR, or 10 EUR for copies, for individuals; 65 to 75 EUR, or 30 EUR for copies, for businesses.
Germany	Regional Government of Düsseldorf	25 EUR	25.00	29.04	For administrative documents from this region. Fee is 25 to 40 EUR for individuals, or 60 to 75 for businesses.
Germany	Regional Government of Münster	30 EUR	30.00	34.84	For administrative documents from this region. Fee is 30 to 70 EUR.
Germany	Supervisory and Service Directorate of Rhineland-Palatinate	33 EUR	33.00	38.33	For administrative documents from this state.
Germany	State Administration Office of Saarland	25 EUR	25.00	29.04	For administrative documents from this state. Fee is 30 EUR for urgent requests in person.
Germany	State Directorate of Saxony	22 EUR	22.00	25.55	For administrative documents from this state.
Germany	State Administration Office of Saxony-Anhalt	10 EUR	10.00	11.61	For administrative documents from this state. Fee is 10 to 50 EUR.
Germany	Ministry of the Interior of Schleswig-Holstein	35 EUR	35.00	40.65	For administrative documents from this state.
Germany	State Administration Office of Thuringia	22 EUR	22.00	25.55	For administrative documents from this state.
Greece	Courts of first instance	13 EUR	13.00	15.10	For judicial and notarial documents from the respective court area. Fee consists of 10 EUR plus stamp of 3 EUR.
Greece	Regional governments				For documents from the respective regional government.
Greece	Decentralized administrations	–	0.00	0.00	For other documents from the respective administration area.
Grenada	Ministry of Foreign Affairs, Trade and Export Development	8 USD	6.89	8.00	Plus 10 USD for expedited service, plus 75 USD for return postage if abroad.
Guatemala	Ministry of Foreign Affairs	10 GTQ	1.13	1.31	
Guyana	Ministry of Foreign Affairs and International Cooperation	20 EUR	20.00	23.23	Fee is 20 EUR, plus 15 EUR for return postage, at the Embassy of Guyana in Brussels, and 35 GBP at the High Commission of Guyana in London.
Honduras	Secretary of Foreign Affairs and International Cooperation	150 HNL	4.80	5.58	
Hungary	Ministry of Justice	–	0.00	0.00	For judicial documents.
Hungary	Chamber of Civil Law Notaries	15,000 HUF	41.00	47.62	For notarial documents.
Hungary	Ministry of Foreign Affairs	5,500 HUF	15.03	17.46	For other documents.
Iceland	Ministry for Foreign Affairs	2,700 ISK	19.37	22.50	Plus 2,000 ISK for postage.
India	Ministry of External Affairs	137 INR	1.23	1.43	134 INR per document plus 3 INR per page, for paper documents; 50 INR for electronic documents.
Indonesia	Ministry of Law	150,000 IDR	7.34	8.52	
Ireland	Department of Foreign Affairs and Trade	40 EUR	40.00	46.46	40 EUR per document in general; 10 EUR per document related to export of goods; 100 EUR per adoption dossier regardless of the number of documents.
Israel	Ministry of Justice and civil courts	41 ILS	11.57	13.44	For notarial documents.
Israel	Ministry of Foreign Affairs	41 ILS	11.57	13.44	For other documents.
Italy	Public prosecutor offices at courts	–	0.00	0.00	For judicial and notarial documents from the respective court area.
Italy	Prefectures	–	0.00	0.00	For other documents from the respective province.
Jamaica	Ministry of Foreign Affairs and Foreign Trade	3,500 JMD	19.07	22.15	3,500 JMD for 5-day service or 5,000 JMD for 1-day service, if applied in Jamaica; 30 USD, 55 USD, 40 CAD, 25 GBP or 20 EUR, if applied through a consulate.
Japan	Ministry of Foreign Affairs	–	0.00	0.00	
Kazakhstan	Ministry of Justice	2,163 KZT	4.14	4.81	For administrative and notarial documents.
Kazakhstan	Ministry of Science and Higher Education	2,163 KZT	4.14	4.81	For higher education documents.
Kazakhstan	Ministry of Education	2,163 KZT	4.14	4.81	For primary, secondary and vocational education documents.
Kazakhstan	Ministry of Internal Affairs	2,163 KZT	4.14	4.81	For documents from this ministry.
Kazakhstan	Ministry of Culture and Information	2,163 KZT	4.14	4.81	For state archives.
Kazakhstan	Judicial Administration	2,163 KZT	4.14	4.81	For judicial documents.
Kazakhstan	Ministry of Finance	2,163 KZT	4.14	4.81	For documents from this ministry.
Kazakhstan	General Prosecutor's Office	2,163 KZT	4.14	4.81	For prosecution and investigation documents.
Kazakhstan	Ministry of Defense	2,163 KZT	4.14	4.81	For documents from this ministry.
Kosovo	Ministry of Internal Affairs	10 EUR	10.00	11.61	For civil registry and civil status documents.
Kosovo	Ministry of Foreign Affairs and Diaspora	10 EUR	10.00	11.61	For other documents.
Kyrgyzstan (Note: The Financial Police was also specified as an authority to apostille documents from this same agency. In 2012, the Financial Police was replaced by the State Service for Combatting Economic Crimes, and the latter was abolished in 2021.)	Ministry of Justice	1,340 KGS	13.19	15.31	For documents from this ministry and notarial documents. Fee is 1,340 KGS for 2-day service, 3,760 KGS for 1-day service, or 8,460 KGS for 3-hour service.
Kyrgyzstan	State Committee on National Security	1,340 KGS	13.19	15.31	For documents from this committee. Fee is 1,340 KGS for 2-day service, 3,760 KGS for 1-day service, or 8,460 KGS for 3-hour service.
Kyrgyzstan	General Prosecutor's Office	1,340 KGS	13.19	15.31	For documents from this office. Fee is 1,340 KGS for 2-day service, 3,760 KGS for 1-day service, or 8,460 KGS for 3-hour service.
Kyrgyzstan	Court Department	1,340 KGS	13.19	15.31	For judicial documents. Fee is 1,340 KGS for 2-day service, 3,760 KGS for 1-day service, or 8,460 KGS for 3-hour service.
Kyrgyzstan	Ministry of Internal Affairs	1,340 KGS	13.19	15.31	For documents from this ministry. Fee is 1,340 KGS for 2-day service, 3,760 KGS for 1-day service, or 8,460 KGS for 3-hour service.
Latvia	Notaries	25.34 EUR	25.34	29.43	
Lesotho	Attorney General				
Lesotho	Permanent Secretaries				
Lesotho	Registry of the High Court				
Lesotho	Magistrate courts				
Liberia	Ministry of Foreign Affairs	25 USD	21.53	25.00	
Liberia	Ministry of Justice				
Liberia	Supreme and Circuit Courts				
Liberia	Liberia Maritime Authority and its special agents				
Liechtenstein	Government Chancellery	30 CHF	31.81	36.95	
Lithuania	Notaries	18.15 EUR	18.15	21.08	Including value added tax of 21%.
Lithuania	Ministry of Foreign Affairs	20 EUR	20.00	23.23	Only for documents submitted through diplomatic missions and by judicial authorities.
Luxembourg	Ministry of Foreign and European Affairs	20 EUR	20.00	23.23	
Malawi	Attorney General and Solicitor General				
Malawi	Permanent Secretaries				
Malawi	Registry of the High Court				
Malawi	Department of the Registrar General				
Malawi	Government agents				
Malawi	Notaries				
Malawi	Magistrate courts				
Malta	Ministry for Foreign and European Affairs	12 EUR	12.00	13.94	No fee for adoption documents, 12 EUR for other personal documents, or 20 EUR for other documents.
Marshall Islands	Minister of Foreign Affairs and Trade				
Marshall Islands	Office of the Attorney General				
Marshall Islands	Clerk and Deputy Clerk of the High Court				
Marshall Islands	Register of Corporations				
Marshall Islands	Office of the Maritime Administrator and its special agents				
Marshall Islands	International Registries office in Switzerland				
Mauritius	Defence and Home Affairs Division of the Prime Minister's Office	100 MUR	1.84	2.14	100 MUR for personal documents of Mauritian citizens, or 500 MUR for other documents.
Mexico	Secretariat of Governance of Mexico	2,126.14 MXN	107.68	125.07	For federal documents.
Mexico	General Secretariat of Government of Aguascalientes	600 MXN	30.39	35.29	For documents from this state.
Mexico	General Secretariat of Government of Baja California	1,098 MXN	55.61	64.59	For documents from this state.
Mexico	General Secretariat of Government of Baja California Sur	560 MXN	28.36	32.94	For documents from this state.
Mexico	Secretariat of Government of Campeche	821 MXN	41.58	48.29	For documents from this state.
Mexico	General Secretariat of Government of Chiapas	1,224 MXN	61.99	72.00	For documents from this state.
Mexico	General Secretariat of Government of Chihuahua	1,632 MXN	82.66	96.00	For documents from this state.
Mexico	Secretariat of Government of Coahuila	546 MXN	27.65	32.12	For documents from this state.
Mexico	General Secretariat of Government of Colima	254 MXN	12.86	14.94	For documents from this state.
Mexico	General Secretariat of Government of Durango	328 MXN	16.61	19.29	For documents from this state.
Mexico	Secretariat of Government of Guanajuato	159 MXN	8.05	9.35	For documents from this state.
Mexico	General Secretariat of Government of Guerrero	465 MXN	23.55	27.35	For documents from this state.
Mexico	Secretariat of Government of Hidalgo	458 MXN	23.20	26.94	For documents from this state.
Mexico	General Secretariat of Government of Jalisco	538 MXN	27.25	31.65	For documents from this state. Fee is 538 MXN normal, 1,076 MXN urgent or 1,614 MXN extraurgent.
Mexico	Secretariat of Government of Mexico City	128 MXN	6.48	7.53	For documents from this city.
Mexico	General Secretariat of Government of Mexico State	472 MXN	23.91	27.76	For documents from this state.
Mexico	Secretariat of Government of Michoacán	136 MXN	6.89	8.00	For documents from this state. Fee is 136 MXN normal, 272 MXN urgent or 408 MXN extraurgent, for documents in general; 412 normal, 824 MXN urgent or 1,236 MXN extraurgent, for diplomas and professional titles; 1,082 MXN normal, 2,164 MXN urgent or 3,246 MXN extraurgent, for curricula.
Mexico	Secretariat of Government of Morelos	704 MXN	35.66	41.41	For documents from this state. Fee is 704 MXN for normal service or 1,408 MXN for urgent service.
Mexico	General Secretariat of Government of Nayarit	369 MXN	18.69	21.71	For documents from this state.
Mexico	General Secretariat of Government of Nuevo León	117 MXN	5.93	6.88	For documents from this state. Fee is 117 MXN for documents in general, 235 MXN for secondary school certificates or criminal records, 469 MXN for warrants, 587 MXN for notarial documents or technical certificates, 1,232 MXN for higher education certificates, or 1,818 MXN for professional titles.
Mexico	Secretariat of Government of Oaxaca	1,156 MXN	58.55	68.00	For documents from this state.
Mexico	Secretariat of Governance of Puebla	405 MXN	20.51	23.82	For documents from this state.
Mexico	Secretariat of Government of Querétaro	703.86 MXN	35.65	41.40	For documents from this state.
Mexico	Secretariat of Government of Quintana Roo	938 MXN	47.51	55.18	For documents from this state.
Mexico	General Secretariat of Government of San Luis Potosí	680 MXN	34.44	40.00	For documents from this state.
Mexico	General Secretariat of Government of Sinaloa	129 MXN	6.53	7.59	For documents from this state. Fee is 129 MXN for documents in general or 323 MXN for professional titles.
Mexico	Secretariat of Government of Sonora	734 MXN	37.17	43.18	For documents from this state.
Mexico	Secretariat of Government of Tabasco	469 MXN	23.75	27.59	For documents from this state.
Mexico	General Secretariat of Government of Tamaulipas	587 MXN	29.73	34.53	For documents from this state.
Mexico	Secretariat of Government of Tlaxcala	–	0.00	0.00	For documents from this state.
Mexico	Secretariat of Government of Veracruz	1,287 MXN	65.18	75.71	For documents from this state.
Mexico	General Secretariat of Government of Yucatán	780 MXN	39.50	45.88	For documents from this state.
Mexico	General Secretariat of Government of Zacatecas	455 MXN	23.04	26.76	For documents from this state.
Moldova	Ministry of Justice	100 MDL	4.98	5.78	For documents requested by individuals and companies. Fee is 100 MDL for individuals or 150 MDL for companies, for 5-day service. For 3-day service, additional fee of 30 MDL, or 15 MDL for disabled applicants.
Moldova	Ministry of Foreign Affairs and European Integration	–	0.00	0.00	For documents requested by the government.
Monaco	Directorate of Judicial Services	5 EUR	5.00	5.81	
Mongolia	Ministry of Foreign Affairs	22,500 MNT	5.38	6.25	22,500 MNT for 3-day service or 42,500 MNT for 1-day service.
Montenegro	Ministry of Justice	4 EUR	4.00	4.65	
Montenegro	Basic courts	12 EUR	12.00	13.94	For documents from the respective court area.
Morocco	Ministry of Justice	–	0.00	0.00	For documents from this ministry.
Morocco	Court of Cassation	–	0.00	0.00	For documents from this court.
Morocco	Courts of first instance	–	0.00	0.00	For other judicial and notarial documents.
Morocco	Regional, provincial and prefectural governments	–	0.00	0.00	For administrative documents from the respective government.
Namibia	Registrars of the Supreme Court and High Court	–	0.00	0.00	Only for judicial and notarial documents.
Namibia	Ministry of Justice and Labour Relations	–	0.00	0.00	
Netherlands	District courts	27 EUR	27.00	31.36	For judicial documents from the respective court and other documents from the European Netherlands.
Netherlands	Lieutenant Governor and Acting Lieutenant Governor of Bonaire				For documents from this island.
Netherlands	Department of Civil Affairs of Bonaire				For documents from this island.
Netherlands	Governor and Acting Governor of Saba				For documents from this island.
Netherlands	Government Commissioner and Deputy Government Commissioner of Sint Eustatius				For documents from this island.
Netherlands	Department of Legislation and Legal Affairs of Aruba				For documents from this island.
Netherlands	Ministry of Administration, Planning and Services of Curaçao	15 XCG	7.22	8.38	For documents from this island.
Netherlands	Ministry of General Affairs of Sint Maarten	25 XCG	12.03	13.97	For documents from this island.
New Zealand	Department of Internal Affairs	32 NZD	16.02	18.60	32 NZD for the first document; 15 NZD per additional document in the same request.
Nicaragua	Ministry of Foreign Affairs	–	0.00	0.00	
Niue	Financial Secretary				
Niue	Crown Law Office				
Niue	Companies Office				
Niue	Registry of the High Court				
Niue	Secretary to Government				
North Macedonia	Ministry of Justice	100 MKD	1.63	1.89	For judicial and notarial documents. Fee is 100 MKD for the first document; 50 MKD per additional document in the same request.
North Macedonia	Basic courts	300 MKD	4.89	5.68	Except for criminal records.
Norway	County governors	–	0.00	0.00	
Oman	Foreign Ministry	10 OMR	22.39	26.01	10, 20 or 30 OMR depending on the type of document, for personal documents; 20 to 150 OMR depending on the type or value of document, for commercial documents.
Pakistan	Ministry of Foreign Affairs	3,000 PKR	9.32	10.83	3,000 PKR for personal, educational and professional documents, 4,500 PKR for legal documents, or 12,000 PKR for commercial documents.
Palau	Ministry of State				
Palau	Clerk of Courts of the Supreme Court				
Panama	Secretary of the Supreme Court of Justice	–	0.00	0.00	For judicial documents.
Panama	Ministry of Government				For notarial documents.
Panama	Ministry of Foreign Affairs	2 PAB	1.72	2.00	
Paraguay	Ministry of Foreign Affairs	223,000 PYG	32.60	37.86	
Peru	Ministry of Foreign Affairs	31 PEN	7.94	9.23	31 PEN if issued on paper, or 18 PEN if issued electronically.
Philippines	Department of Foreign Affairs	100 PHP	1.37	1.59	100 PHP for 5-day service or 200 PHP for 2-day service.
Poland	National Agency for Academic Exchange	60 PLN	13.89	16.13	For university documents.
Poland	Ministry of Culture and National Heritage				For art school documents.
Poland	Ministry of National Education				For documents from Polish schools located abroad or supplementing foreign education.
Poland	Education offices	–	0.00	0.00	For school documents from the respective area.
Poland	Regional examination commissions	–	0.00	0.00	For certificates issued by the respective commission.
Poland	Ministry of Foreign Affairs	60 PLN	13.89	16.13	For other documents.
Portugal	Office of the Attorney General of the Republic	10.20 EUR	10.20	11.85	For documents from any region. Fee may be waived due to financial hardship.
Portugal	Regional Attorney General Offices of Porto, Coimbra and Évora	10.20 EUR	10.20	11.85	For documents from the respective region, and in some cases from other regions. Fee may be waived due to financial hardship.
Portugal	County Attorney Offices of Azores and Madeira	10.20 EUR	10.20	11.85	For documents from the respective region, and in some cases from other regions. Fee may be waived due to financial hardship.
Portugal	Court of Appeal of Guimarães	10.20 EUR	10.20	11.85	For documents from the respective region, and in some cases from other regions. Fee may be waived due to financial hardship.
Romania	County courts and Court of Bucharest	20 RON	3.81	4.42	For judicial documents from the respective court area. Fee is 10 RON per request plus 10 RON per document.
Romania	Chambers of Notaries Public	59.50 RON	11.33	13.16	For documents executed by a notary from the respective chamber. Fee includes value added tax of 19%.
Romania	Offices of the prefects	–	0.00	0.00	For other documents.
Russia	Ministry of Internal Affairs	2,500 RUB	25.63	29.76	For criminal records.
Russia	Ministry of Defense	2,500 RUB	25.63	29.76	For military documents.
Russia	Office of the Prosecutor General	2,500 RUB	25.63	29.76	For documents from this office.
Russia	Federal Archival Agency	2,500 RUB	25.63	29.76	For federal archives.
Russia	Archival agencies of federal subjects	2,500 RUB	25.63	29.76	For archives of the respective federal subject.
Russia	Directorates of civil registry of federal subjects	2,500 RUB	25.63	29.76	For civil status documents.
Russia	Ministries of education of federal subjects	2,500 RUB	25.63	29.76	For educational documents.
Russia	Ministry of Justice	2,500 RUB	25.63	29.76	For other documents.
Rwanda	Ministry of Foreign Affairs and International Cooperation	10,000 RWF	5.86	6.80	
Saint Kitts and Nevis	Ministry of Foreign Affairs	55 XCD	17.54	20.37	
Saint Kitts and Nevis	Attorney General's Office and Ministry of Justice and Legal Affairs				
Saint Kitts and Nevis	Legal Department of Nevis				
Saint Kitts and Nevis	Ministry of Finance of Nevis				
Saint Lucia	Ministry of External Affairs, International Trade, Civil Aviation and Diaspora Affairs	50 XCD	15.94	18.52	
Saint Lucia	Ministry of Finance, Economic Development and the Youth Economy				
Saint Lucia	Registry of Companies and Intellectual Property				
Saint Lucia	Registry of the Supreme Court				
Saint Lucia	Solicitor General				
Saint Vincent and the Grenadines	Ministry of Foreign Affairs and Foreign Trade				
Saint Vincent and the Grenadines	Registry of the High Court				
Saint Vincent and the Grenadines	Ministry of Legal Affairs	–	0.00	0.00	
Saint Vincent and the Grenadines	International Financial Services Authority				
Samoa	Ministry of Foreign Affairs and Trade	30 USD	25.83	30.00	
San Marino	Ministry of Foreign Affairs	5 EUR	5.00	5.81	5 EUR for documents in general, or 8 EUR for notarial documents.
São Tomé and Príncipe	Ministry of Foreign Affairs, Cooperation and Communities	100 STN	4.08	4.74	
Saudi Arabia	Ministry of Foreign Affairs	30 SAR	6.89	8.00	
Senegal	Ministry of Foreign Affairs and Senegalese Abroad	2,000 XOF	3.05	3.54	
Serbia	Ministry of Justice				
Serbia	Basic courts	2,090 RSD	17.82	20.69	For documents from the respective court area. Fee is 190 RSD per request plus 1,900 RSD per document; 490 RSD to certify translation.
Seychelles	Ministry of Foreign Affairs and Tourism				
Seychelles	Office of the Attorney General				
Seychelles	Secretary of State for Cabinet Affairs				
Seychelles	Registry of the Supreme Court	250 SCR	15.05	17.48	
Singapore	Singapore Academy of Law	10.70 SGD	7.25	8.43	87.20 SGD for notarial documents, or 10.70 SGD for other documents.
Slovakia	Ministry of Justice	10 EUR	10.00	11.61	For judicial documents.
Slovakia	Regional courts	10 EUR	10.00	11.61	For notarial documents from the respective region.
Slovakia	Ministry of the Interior	10 EUR	10.00	11.61	For citizenship, personal status and license documents.
Slovakia	District offices	10 EUR	10.00	11.61	For civil registry and residence documents.
Slovakia	Ministry of Education, Science, Research and Sport	10 EUR	10.00	11.61	For educational documents, except medical.
Slovakia	Ministry of Health	10 EUR	10.00	11.61	For medical educational documents.
Slovakia	Ministry of Defence	10 EUR	10.00	11.61	For military documents.
Slovakia	Ministry of Foreign and European Affairs	20 EUR	20.00	23.23	For other documents.
Slovenia	Ministry of Justice	3 EUR	3.00	3.48	For notarial documents.
Slovenia	District courts	2.46 EUR	2.46	2.86	2.46 EUR for documents in Slovene; 5 EUR for documents in other languages.
South Africa	Magistrates' courts				
South Africa	Registries of superior courts				For judicial and notarial documents from the respective court area.
South Africa	Department of Justice and Constitutional Development				
South Africa	Department of International Relations and Cooperation	–	0.00	0.00	For other documents.
South Korea	Ministry of Foreign Affairs				
South Korea	Overseas Koreans Agency	–	0.00	0.00	For administrative documents. No fee if requested electronically, or 1,000 KRW if requested in person or by mail.
South Korea	Ministry of Justice	–	0.00	0.00	For judicial and notarial documents. No fee if requested electronically, or 1,000 KRW if requested in person or by mail.
South Korea	National Court Administration				
Spain	Ministry of Justice	–	0.00	0.00	For administrative and judicial documents, except from the Supreme and National courts.
Spain	Governance secretaries of the high courts of justice	–	0.00	0.00	For administrative and judicial documents, except from the Supreme and National courts.
Spain	Governance secretaries of the Supreme Court and National Court				For documents from the respective court.
Spain	Notarial College of Andalusia				For administrative and notarial documents.
Spain	Notarial College of Aragon				For administrative and notarial documents.
Spain	Notarial College of Asturias				For administrative and notarial documents.
Spain	Notarial College of the Balearic Islands				For administrative and notarial documents.
Spain	Notarial College of the Basque Country	25 EUR	25.00	29.04	For administrative and notarial documents. Fee is 25 EUR for 3-day service or 45 EUR for same-day service.
Spain	Notarial College of the Canary Islands				For administrative and notarial documents.
Spain	Notarial College of Cantabria				For administrative and notarial documents.
Spain	Notarial College of Castile and León				For administrative and notarial documents.
Spain	Notarial College of Castile-La Mancha				For administrative and notarial documents.
Spain	Notarial College of Catalonia	25 EUR	25.00	29.04	For administrative and notarial documents. Fee is 25 EUR for normal service or 50 EUR for urgent service.
Spain	Notarial College of Extremadura				For administrative and notarial documents.
Spain	Notarial College of Galicia				For administrative and notarial documents.
Spain	Notarial College of La Rioja				For administrative and notarial documents.
Spain	Notarial College of Madrid	25 EUR	25.00	29.04	For administrative and notarial documents. Fee is 25 EUR for 3-day service, 50 EUR for next-day service or 65 EUR for same-day service.
Spain	Notarial College of Murcia				For administrative and notarial documents.
Spain	Notarial College of Navarre				For administrative and notarial documents.
Spain	Notarial College of Valencia				For administrative and notarial documents.
Suriname	Registry of the Court of Justice	10 SRD	0.23	0.26	
Sweden	Notaries	350 SEK	31.13	36.16	Fee varies by notary, at least from 350 to 1,000 SEK. A municipal employee notary does not charge a fee.
Switzerland	Federal Chancellery	20 CHF	21.21	24.63	For federal documents.
Switzerland	Identification Center of Aargau	40 CHF	42.41	49.26	For documents from this canton.
Switzerland	Cantonal Chancellery of Appenzell Ausserrhoden	25 CHF	26.51	30.79	For documents from this canton.
Switzerland	Council Chancellery of Appenzell Innerrhoden	40 CHF	42.41	49.26	For documents from this canton.
Switzerland	State Chancellery of Basel-Landschaft	20 CHF	21.21	24.63	For documents from this canton.
Switzerland	Justice and Security Department of Basel-Stadt	20 CHF	21.21	24.63	For documents from this canton.
Switzerland	State Chancellery of Bern	25 CHF	26.51	30.79	For documents from this canton.
Switzerland	State Chancellery of Fribourg	10 CHF	10.60	12.32	For documents from this canton. Fee is 10 CHF for civil status documents, or 20 to 40 CHF for notarial documents.
Switzerland	Cantonal Office of Population and Migrations of Geneva	30 CHF	31.81	36.95	For documents from this canton. Additional fee of 8 CHF per signature after the first signature in the same document.
Switzerland	State Chancellery of Glarus	25 CHF	26.51	30.79	For documents from this canton.
Switzerland	State Chancellery of Grisons	10 CHF	10.60	12.32	For documents from this canton. Fee is 10 CHF for civil status and educational documents, driving license, life, death and residence certificates, and invitation of foreigners; 20 to 35 CHF for other documents.
Switzerland	Passport and Legalisation Office of Jura	32 CHF	33.93	39.41	For documents from this canton. Fee is 32 CHF for personal documents, or 38 CHF for commercial documents. Maximum fee of 150 CHF for set of documents regarding adoption or deceased person.
Switzerland	State Chancellery of Lucerne	30 CHF	31.81	36.95	For documents from this canton. Fee is 30 CHF per document in general, or 10 CHF per document regarding adoption or child support.
Switzerland	State Chancellery of Neuchâtel	25 CHF	26.51	30.79	For documents from this canton.
Switzerland	State Chancellery of Nidwalden	25 CHF	26.51	30.79	For documents from this canton.
Switzerland	State Chancellery of Obwalden	30 CHF	31.81	36.95	For documents from this canton.
Switzerland	State Chancellery of Sankt Gallen	50 CHF	53.02	61.58	For documents from this canton.
Switzerland	State Chancellery of Schaffhausen	40 CHF	42.41	49.26	For documents from this canton.
Switzerland	State Chancellery of Schwyz	25 CHF	26.51	30.79	For documents from this canton. Plus 8 CHF for postage.
Switzerland	State Chancellery of Solothurn	30 CHF	31.81	36.95	For documents from this canton.
Switzerland	Cantonal Identification Office of Thurgau	40 CHF	42.41	49.26	For documents from this canton. Additional fee of 10 CHF per document, for 5 or more documents requested on the same day.
Switzerland	State Chancellery of Ticino	18 CHF	19.09	22.17	For documents from this canton. Fee is 18 CHF for civil status documents, 35 CHF for notarial documents, or 30 CHF for other documents.
Switzerland	State Chancellery of Uri	20 CHF	21.21	24.63	For documents from this canton.
Switzerland	State Chancellery of Valais	30 CHF	31.81	36.95	For documents from this canton.
Switzerland	Legalisation Office of Lausanne District	30 CHF	31.81	36.95	For documents from Vaud.
Switzerland	State Chancellery of Zug	30 CHF	31.81	36.95	For documents from this canton.
Switzerland	State Chancellery of Zürich	23 CHF	24.39	28.33	For documents from this canton. Fee is 23 CHF for civil status documents, or 30 CHF for other documents.
Tajikistan	Ministry of Justice	94.98 TJS	8.84	10.27	For civil registry, judicial and notarial documents. Fee is 48.75 TJS plus the equivalent of 5 USD in TJS for individuals, or 97.50 TJS plus the equivalent of 10 USD in TJS for companies.
Tajikistan	Ministry of Foreign Affairs	94.98 TJS	8.84	10.27	For other documents. Fee is 48.75 TJS plus the equivalent of 5 USD in TJS for individuals, or 97.50 TJS plus the equivalent of 10 USD in TJS for companies.
Thailand	Ministry of Foreign Affairs				
Tonga	Ministry of Foreign Affairs				
Trinidad and Tobago	Registrar General's Department	–	0.00	0.00	
Trinidad and Tobago	Ministry of Education				
Trinidad and Tobago	Ministry of Foreign and CARICOM Affairs				
Tunisia	Notaries	20 TND	5.94	6.90	10 TND for notarial documents, or 20 TND for other documents.
Turkey	Provincial and district governments	–	0.00	0.00	For administrative documents. For apostilles issued electronically, the fee is 80 TRY for civil registry documents.
Turkey	Presidencies of judicial commissions in locations with high criminal courts	–	0.00	0.00	For judicial documents. For apostilles issued electronically, the fee is 80 TRY for criminal records or 160 TRY for court decisions.
Ukraine	Ministry of Education and Science	51 UAH	0.99	1.15	For educational documents. Fee is 51 UAH for individuals or 85 UAH for companies, plus 300 to 1,650 UAH for expedited service.
Ukraine	Ministry of Justice	670 UAH	12.96	15.06	For judicial, civil status and notarial documents. Fee is 670 UAH for individuals or 1,160 UAH for companies.
Ukraine	Ministry of Internal Affairs	51 UAH	0.99	1.15	For criminal records.
Ukraine	State Migration Service	51 UAH	0.99	1.15	For migration documents.
Ukraine	State Tax Service	51 UAH	0.99	1.15	For tax documents.
Ukraine	Ministry of Foreign Affairs	150 UAH	2.90	3.37	For other documents. Fee is 150 UAH for individuals or 450 UAH for companies, for 10-day service; or 300 UAH for individuals or 900 UAH for companies, for 5-day service.
United Kingdom	Foreign, Commonwealth and Development Office	45 GBP	52.36	60.81	For documents from England, Wales, Scotland and Northern Ireland. Fee is 45 GBP for standard service, 40 GBP for next-day business service, or 100 GBP for same-day business service, for paper apostille; 35 GBP for electronic apostille.
United Kingdom	Office of the Governor of Anguilla	60 XCD	19.13	22.22	For documents from this territory.
United Kingdom	Parliamentary Registry of Bermuda	56 BMD	48.22	56.00	For documents from this territory.
United Kingdom	Polar Regions Department				For documents from the British Antarctic Territory.
United Kingdom	Office of the Deputy Governor of the British Virgin Islands	50 USD	43.05	50.00	For documents from this territory.
United Kingdom	Passport and Corporate Services Office of the Cayman Islands	150 KYD	154.98	180.00	For documents from this territory. Fee is 150 KYD for normal service, or 200 KYD for express service.
United Kingdom	Chambers of the Attorney General of the Falkland Islands	36 FKP	41.89	48.65	For documents from this territory.
United Kingdom	Civil Status and Registration Office of Gibraltar	36 GIP	41.89	48.65	For documents from this territory. Additional fee of 72 GIP for urgent service.
United Kingdom	Greffe of the Royal Court of Guernsey	45 GBP	52.36	60.81	For documents from this dependency. Fee is 45 GBP for normal service, or 90 GBP for immediate service.
United Kingdom	Courts of Justice of the Isle of Man	32 GBP	37.23	43.24	For documents from this dependency. Fee is 32 GBP for 2-day service, or 108.80 GBP for 90-minute service.
United Kingdom	Legalisation Office of Jersey	30 GBP	34.91	40.54	For documents from this dependency. Fee is 30 GBP for standard service, or 75 GBP for same-day service.
United Kingdom	Record Office of Montserrat	50 XCD	15.94	18.52	For documents from this territory.
United Kingdom	Office of the Governor of Saint Helena				For documents from this territory.
United Kingdom	Office of the Administrator of Ascension Island				For documents from this territory.
United Kingdom	Office of the Administrator of Tristan da Cunha				For documents from this territory.
United Kingdom	Office of the Commissioner for South Georgia and the South Sandwich Islands				For documents from this territory.
United Kingdom	Office of the Registrar General of the Turks and Caicos Islands	100 USD	86.10	100.00	For documents from this territory.
United States	United States Department of State	20 USD	17.22	20.00	For federal administrative documents. No fee for consular documents.
United States	Supreme Court of the United States				For documents from this court.
United States	United States courts of appeals	50 USD	43.05	50.00	For documents from the respective court.
United States	United States district courts	50 USD	43.05	50.00	For documents from the respective court.
United States	United States Court of Federal Claims	50 USD	43.05	50.00	For documents from this court.
United States	United States Court of International Trade				For documents from this court.
United States	Alabama Secretary of State	5 USD	4.31	5.00	For documents from this state.
United States	Office of the Lieutenant Governor of Alaska	5 USD	4.31	5.00	For documents from this state.
United States	Office of the Secretary of American Samoa	25 USD	21.53	25.00	For documents from this territory.
United States	Arizona Secretary of State	3 USD	2.58	3.00	For documents from this state. Additional fee of 25 USD for expedited service, per request up to 6 documents.
United States	Arkansas Secretary of State	10 USD	8.61	10.00	For documents from this state.
United States	California Secretary of State	20 USD	17.22	20.00	For documents from this state. Additional fee of 6 USD for expedited service in person, per official whose signature will be authenticated.
United States	Colorado Secretary of State	5 USD	4.31	5.00	For documents from this state.
United States	Office of the Secretary of the State of Connecticut	40 USD	34.44	40.00	For documents from this state. Fee is 40 USD for documents in general, or 15 USD for documents related to adoption. Additional fee of 50 USD for expedited service.
United States	Delaware Department of State	30 USD	25.83	30.00	For documents from this state. Fee is 30 USD per request, regardless of the number of documents, for personal use; or 30 USD per document, for commercial use. Additional fee of 40, 50, 500 or 1,000 USD for 1-day, same-day, 2-hour or 1-hour service, respectively.
United States	Office of the Secretary of the District of Columbia	15 USD	12.92	15.00	For documents from this district.
United States	Florida Department of State	10 USD	8.61	10.00	For documents from this state. Additional fee of 10 USD for documents certified by the clerk of a county court.
United States	Georgia Superior Court Clerks' Cooperative Authority	3 USD	2.58	3.00	For documents from this state.
United States	Guam Department of Administration	50 USD	43.05	50.00	For documents from this territory.
United States	Office of the Lieutenant Governor of Hawaii	3 USD	2.58	3.00	For documents from this state. Additional fee of 3 USD for notarial documents.
United States	Idaho Secretary of State's Office	10 USD	8.61	10.00	For documents from this state.
United States	Office of the Illinois Secretary of State	2 USD	1.72	2.00	For documents from this state.
United States	Indiana Secretary of State	2 USD	1.72	2.00	For documents from this state. No fee for birth or death certificates, adoption documents, student transcripts or diplomas.
United States	Iowa Secretary of State	5 USD	4.31	5.00	For documents from this state.
United States	Kansas Secretary of State	7.50 USD	6.46	7.50	For documents from this state.
United States	Office of the Kentucky Secretary of State	5 USD	4.31	5.00	For documents from this state. Additional fee of 5 USD for notarial documents.
United States	Louisiana Secretary of State	20 USD	17.22	20.00	For documents from this state. Fee is 20 USD for documents in general, or 10 USD for documents related to adoption.
United States	Department of the Secretary of State of Maine	10 USD	8.61	10.00	For documents from this state.
United States	Maryland Secretary of State	5 USD	4.31	5.00	For documents from this state. Additional fee of 1 USD for notarial documents.
United States	Secretary of the Commonwealth of Massachusetts	6 USD	5.17	6.00	For documents from this state.
United States	Michigan Department of State	1 USD	0.86	1.00	For documents from this state.
United States	Office of the Minnesota Secretary of State	5 USD	4.31	5.00	For documents from this state.
United States	Mississippi Secretary of State's Office	5 USD	4.31	5.00	For documents from this state.
United States	Missouri Secretary of State	10 USD	8.61	10.00	For documents from this state. Maximum fee of 100 USD for set of documents related to adoption.
United States	Montana Secretary of State	10 USD	8.61	10.00	For documents from this state.
United States	Nebraska Secretary of State	10 USD	8.61	10.00	For documents from this state.
United States	Nevada Secretary of State	20 USD	17.22	20.00	For documents from this state. Additional fee of 75, 125, 500 or 1,000 USD for expedited service in 24, 4, 2 or 1 hour, respectively, per notary to be authenticated.
United States	New Hampshire Secretary of State's Office	10 USD	8.61	10.00	For documents from this state. Additional fee of 25 USD for expedited service for every 10 documents.
United States	Division of Revenue and Enterprise Services of New Jersey	26 USD	22.39	26.00	For documents from this state. Fee is 25 USD for standard service or 40 USD for expedited service, plus 1 USD if paid by electronic check or 2.50 USD by credit card, for documents in general; or 5 USD for standard service or 20 USD for expedited service, for documents related to adoption.
United States	New Mexico Secretary of State	3 USD	2.58	3.00	For documents from this state.
United States	New York Department of State	10 USD	8.61	10.00	For documents from this state. Additional fee of 3 or 5 USD for county, municipal or notarial documents.
United States	North Carolina Secretary of State	10 USD	8.61	10.00	For documents from this state. Fee is 10 USD for documents in general, or 5 USD for duplicate documents related to adoption if requested at the same time.
United States	North Dakota Secretary of State	15 USD	12.92	15.00	For documents from this state. Fee is 10 USD per document plus 5 USD per official whose signature will be authenticated.
United States	Office of the Attorney General of the Northern Mariana Islands	50 USD	43.05	50.00	For documents from this territory.
United States	Ohio Secretary of State	5 USD	4.31	5.00	For documents from this state.
United States	Oklahoma Secretary of State	25 USD	21.53	25.00	For documents from this state. Fee is 25 USD for documents in general, or 10 USD for documents related to adoption.
United States	Oregon Secretary of State	10 USD	8.61	10.00	For documents from this state.
United States	Pennsylvania Department of State	15 USD	12.92	15.00	For documents from this state.
United States	Department of State of Puerto Rico	3 USD	2.58	3.00	For documents from this territory.
United States	Rhode Island Department of State	5 USD	4.31	5.00	For documents from this state.
United States	South Carolina Secretary of State's Office	5 USD	4.31	5.00	For documents from this state.
United States	South Dakota Secretary of State	25 USD	21.53	25.00	For documents from this state. Additional fee of 50 USD for expedited service.
United States	Tennessee Secretary of State	2 USD	1.72	2.00	For documents from this state. Additional fee of 5 USD for notarial documents.
United States	Texas Secretary of State	15 USD	12.92	15.00	For documents from this state. Fee is 15 USD for documents in general; or 10 USD for documents related to adoption, up to 100 USD per adoption.
United States	Office of the Lieutenant Governor of the United States Virgin Islands	25 USD	21.53	25.00	For documents from this territory.
United States	Office of the Lieutenant Governor of Utah	19 USD	16.36	19.00	For documents from this state. Fee is 19 USD for documents in general, or 10 USD for documents related to adoption. Additional fee of 34 USD for next-day service, or 74 USD for same-day service.
United States	Vermont Secretary of State	10 USD	8.61	10.00	For documents from this state.
United States	Office of the Secretary of the Commonwealth of Virginia	10 USD	8.61	10.00	For documents from this state. Fee is 10 USD for the first document, and 5 USD for each additional document signed by the same official on the same day intended for the same state.
United States	Washington Secretary of State	15 USD	12.92	15.00	For documents from this state. Additional fee of 100 USD for expedited service for every 10 documents.
United States	West Virginia Secretary of State	10 USD	8.61	10.00	For documents from this state. Fee is 10 USD for the first document, and 5 USD for each additional document.
United States	Office of the Wisconsin Secretary of State	10 USD	8.61	10.00	For documents from this state. Fee is 10 USD for standard service or 35 USD for expedited service.
United States	Wisconsin Department of Financial Institutions	10 USD	8.61	10.00	For documents from this state. Fee is 10 USD for standard service or 35 USD for expedited service.
United States	Wyoming Secretary of State	20 USD	17.22	20.00	For documents from this state.
Uruguay	Ministry of Foreign Affairs	777 UYU	16.64	19.33	Fee may be waived due to financial hardship. No fee for BPS power of attorney or for transfer of remains.
Uzbekistan	Regional departments of justice	82,400 UZS	6.01	6.98	For documents from the respective judicial authorities and civil registries. Fee is 82,400 UZS if applied in person, or 74,160 UZS electronically.
Uzbekistan	Supreme Court	41,200 UZS	3.01	3.49	For documents from courts. Fee is 41,200 UZS if applied at the issuing authority, 82,400 UZS at a public service center, or 74,160 UZS electronically.
Uzbekistan	Prosecutor General's Office	41,200 UZS	3.01	3.49	For prosecution and investigation documents. Fee is 41,200 UZS if applied at the issuing authority, 82,400 UZS at a public service center, or 74,160 UZS electronically.
Uzbekistan	State Inspectorate for Supervision of Quality in Education	82,400 UZS	6.01	6.98	For educational documents. Fee is 82,400 UZS if applied in person, or 74,160 UZS electronically.
Uzbekistan	Ministry of Foreign Affairs	41,200 UZS	3.01	3.49	For other documents. Fee is 41,200 UZS if applied at the issuing authority, 82,400 UZS at a public service center, or 74,160 UZS electronically.
Vanuatu	Department of Foreign Affairs				
Vanuatu	Vanuatu Financial Services Commission				For business and financial documents.
Venezuela	Ministry of Foreign Affairs	70 USD	60.27	70.00	Equivalent of 70 USD in VED for civil registry, notarial, judicial, commercial and university documents; no fee for criminal records and driving licenses; equivalent of 5.17 USD in VED for other documents, if applied in Venezuela; 60 USD or 60 EUR for other documents of applicants over age 18, or no fee under age 18, if applied at a consulate.
Vietnam	Consular Department of the Ministry of Foreign Affairs	30,000 VND	1.00	1.16	
Vietnam	Ho Chi Minh City Department of Foreign Affairs	30,000 VND	1.00	1.16	

=== Format ===
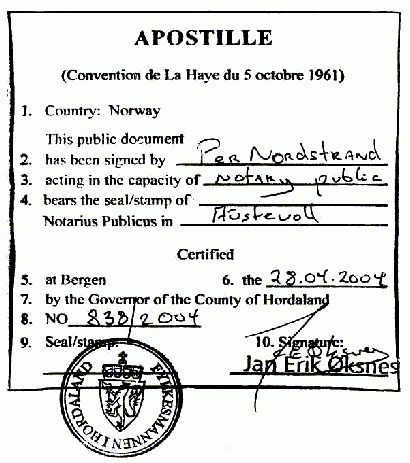
An apostille issued by Norway

The apostille is a stamp or printed form, placed on the document itself or attached to the document as an allonge. At the top is the title Apostille, followed by (Convention de La Haye du 5 octobre 1961) (French for "Hague Convention of 5 October 1961"). The convention specifies that this text must be in French. After this text, the apostille contains ten numbered fields, which may be in English, French or the language of the competent authority, and may be repeated in one or more additional languages. The numbered fields contain the following information:

1. Country: [e.g. Hong Kong, China]
  This public document
2. has been signed by [e.g. Henry CHO]
3. acting in the capacity of [e.g. Notary Public]
4. bears the seal/stamp of [e.g. High Court of Hong Kong]
  Certified
5. at [location or authority issuing the apostille, e.g. High Court]
6. the [e.g. 16 April 2014]
7. by [e.g. Louis TANG, Registrar, High Court]
8. No. [e.g. 2536218517]
9. Seal/stamp: [of the authority issuing the apostille, e.g. Emblem of Hong Kong Special Administrative Region]
10. Signature: [of the official issuing the apostille]

=== Verification ===
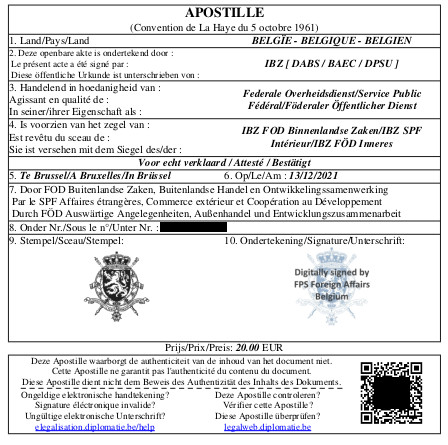
An electronic apostille issued by Belgium

Each competent authority must maintain a register of apostilles issued, for verification on request by anyone.

In 2006, the electronic apostille program (also known as e-APP) was launched to support the electronic issuance and verification of apostilles around the world. Since then, many contracting states have implemented electronic apostilles or electronic registers for their verification.

=== Validity ===
Apostilles never expire. However, a document certified with an apostille may have an expiration date, or the destination state may require that the document be presented by a certain time.

=== Additional requirements ===
The apostille replaces the legalisation requirement, but the destination state may have additional requirements for the document to be used there. For example, it may require that the document be translated into a certain language, although it must not require a translation of the apostille itself.

== Benefits and disadvantages ==
The Apostille Convention is beneficial in cases that would otherwise require certifications by both the origin and destination states, as the convention removes the latter requirement. However, the convention is neutral in cases that would otherwise require only a certification by the state of origin anyway, similar to an apostille, or no certification at all, and it can be disadvantageous in cases where a consular certification alone would otherwise be sufficient to legalise a document. The convention requires that contracting states direct their embassies and consulates to no longer perform legalisations of documents where the convention applies, so in this case the apostille is the only method available to certify the document, not only an alternative to consular legalisation, even if the latter would be simpler or less expensive.

For example, before Brazil acceded to the Apostille Convention, to legalise an educational document from the United States for academic use in Brazil, it was sufficient for the document to be certified by a Brazilian embassy or consulate in the United States, for a fee of 5 USD. After the convention entered into force in Brazil, its embassy and consulates in the United States no longer perform legalisations, so U.S. documents must have an apostille to be accepted in Brazil. In some U.S. states, an apostille of an educational document requires more certifications or a higher fee than the Brazilian consular legalisation did.

This result is an unintended consequence, as the convention still allows states to further simplify or eliminate the legalisation requirement. The Hague Conference also encourages contracting states to eliminate the need for additional certifications before issuing an apostille, and to ensure that any fees are reasonable.

== Limitations and abuse ==
The apostille only certifies that the signature, signer's capacity, and seal or stamp on the document are from the stated issuer. In other words, it only certifies the origin of the document, but it does not provide information about its content. In 2008, the Hague Conference expressed serious concerns about diplomas and certificates issued by diploma mills, citing their possible use "to circumvent migration controls, possibly by potential terrorists." The risk comes from the fact that the various government stamps give the document an air of authenticity without anyone having checked the underlying document. To address this concern, in 2009 the Hague Conference recommended that authorities add the following statement to apostilles: "This apostille only certifies the signature, the capacity of the signer, and the seal or stamp it bears. It does not certify the content of the document for which it was issued."

== Gallery of apostilles by state ==
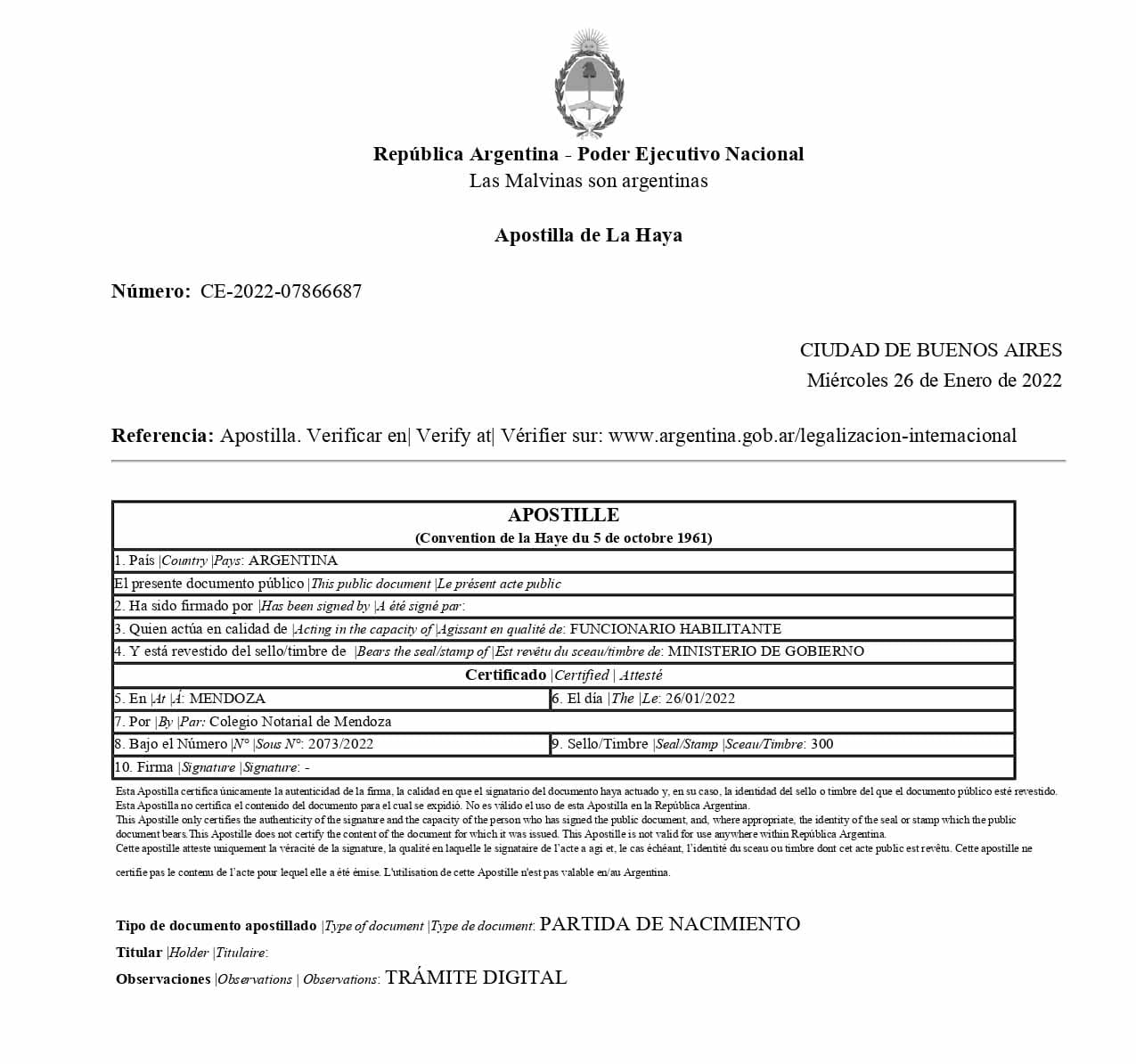
Argentina
Notarial College of Mendoza

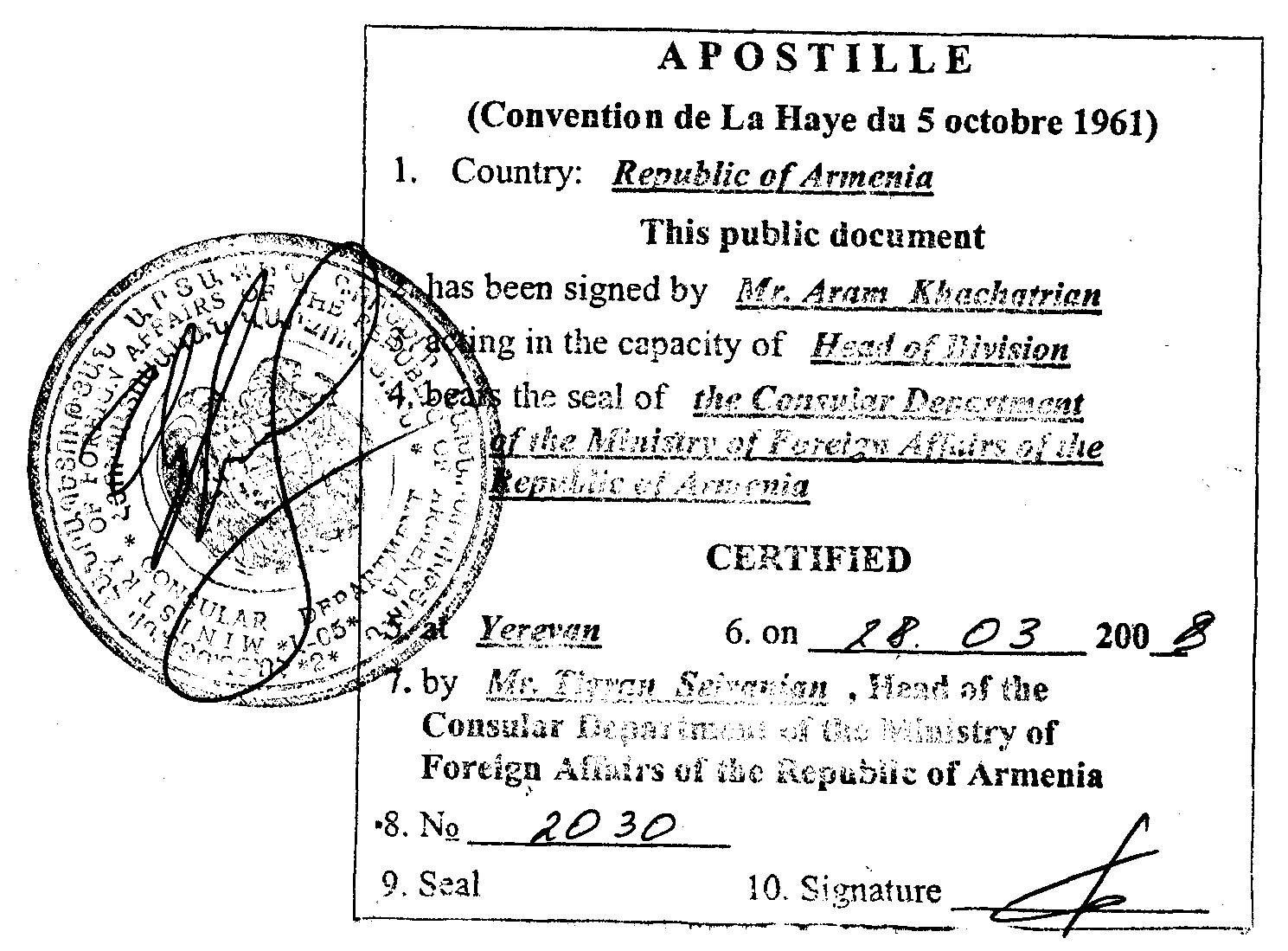
Armenia
Ministry of Foreign Affairs

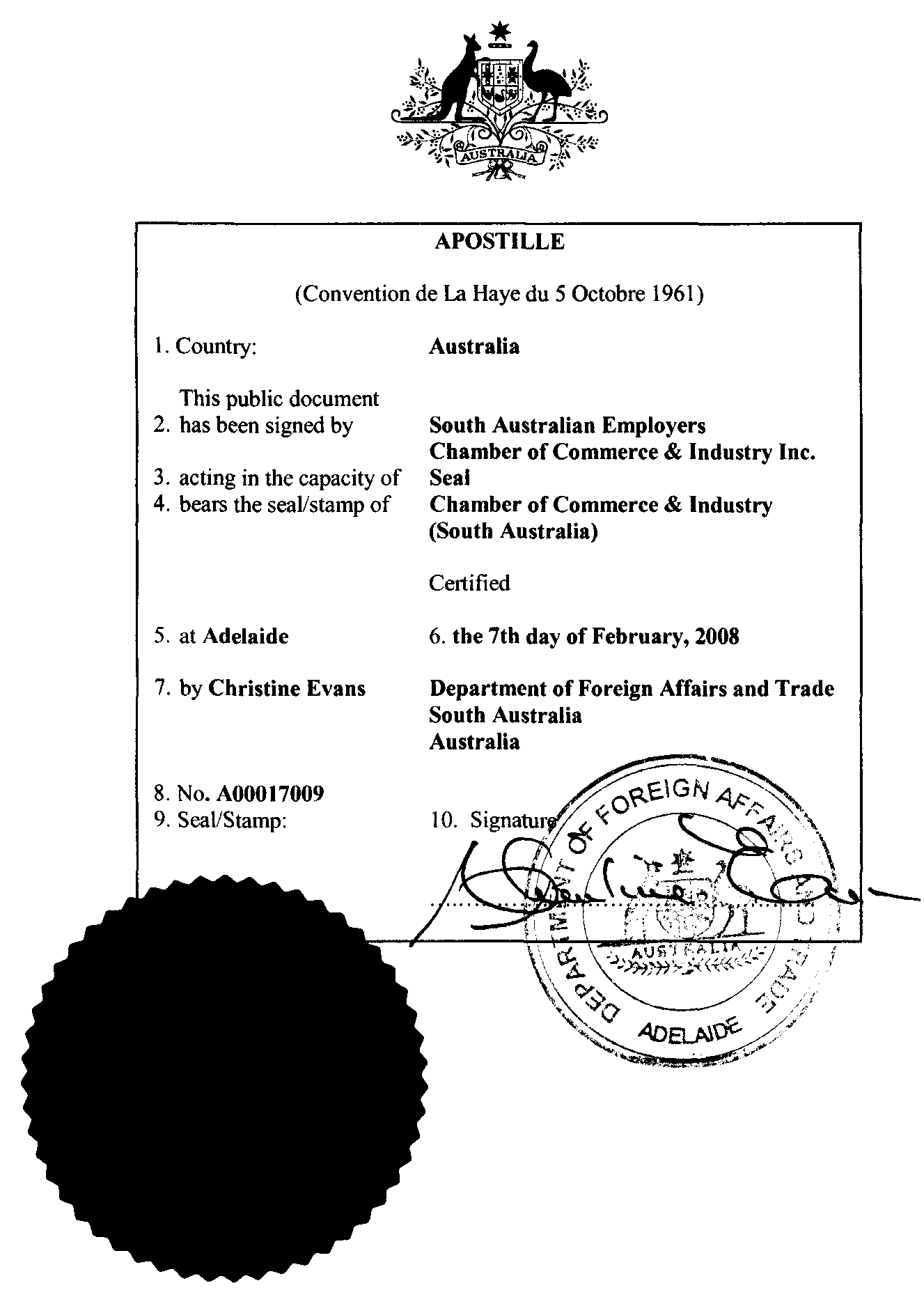
Australia
Department of Foreign Affairs and Trade

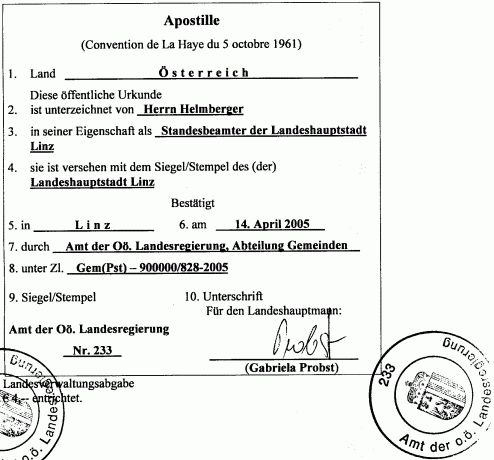
Austria
Office of the Government of Upper Austria

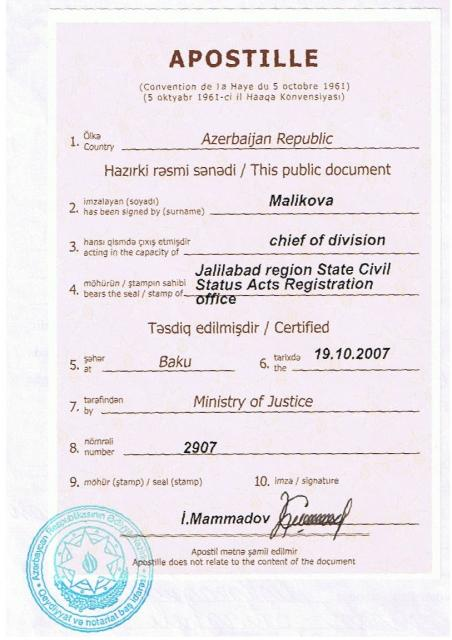
Azerbaijan
Ministry of Justice

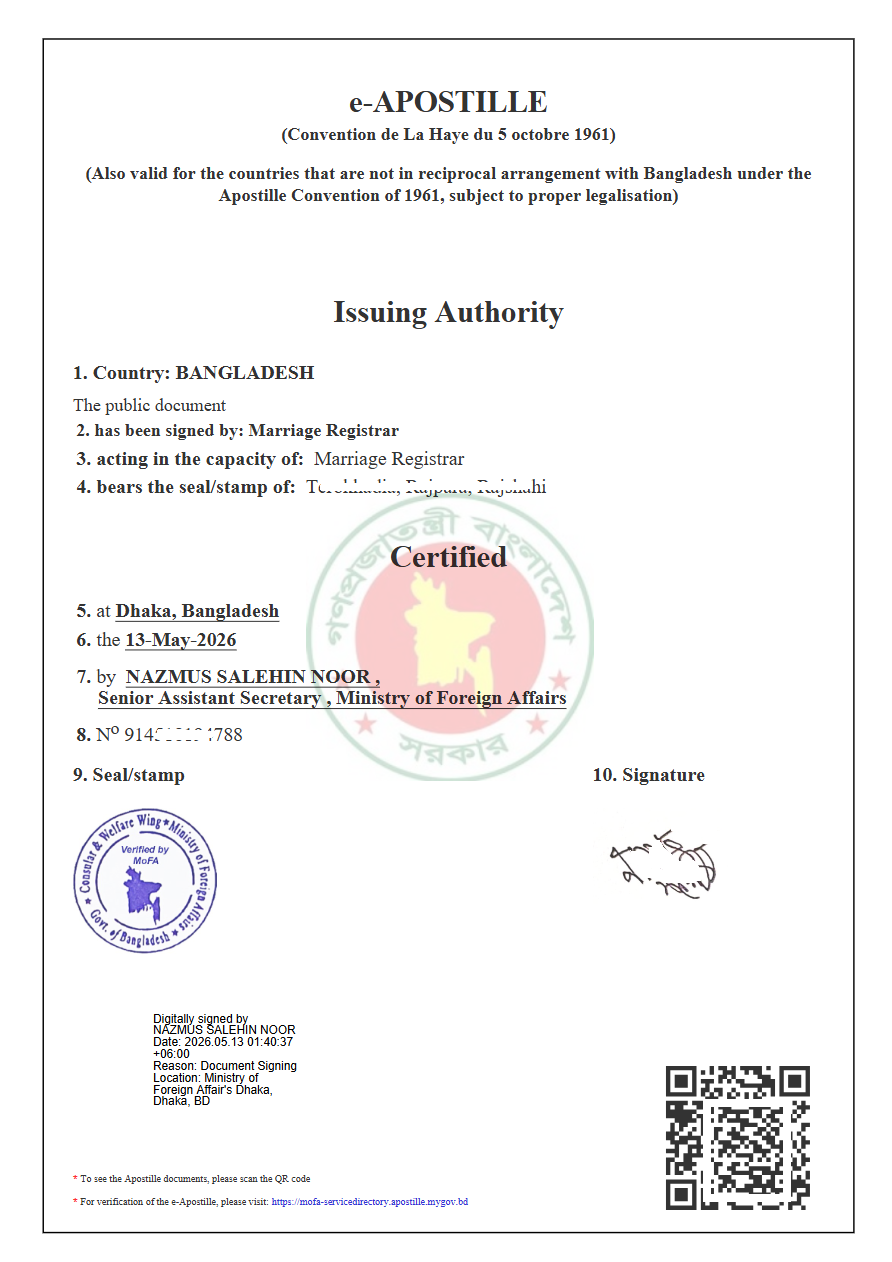
Bangladesh
Ministry of Foreign Affairs

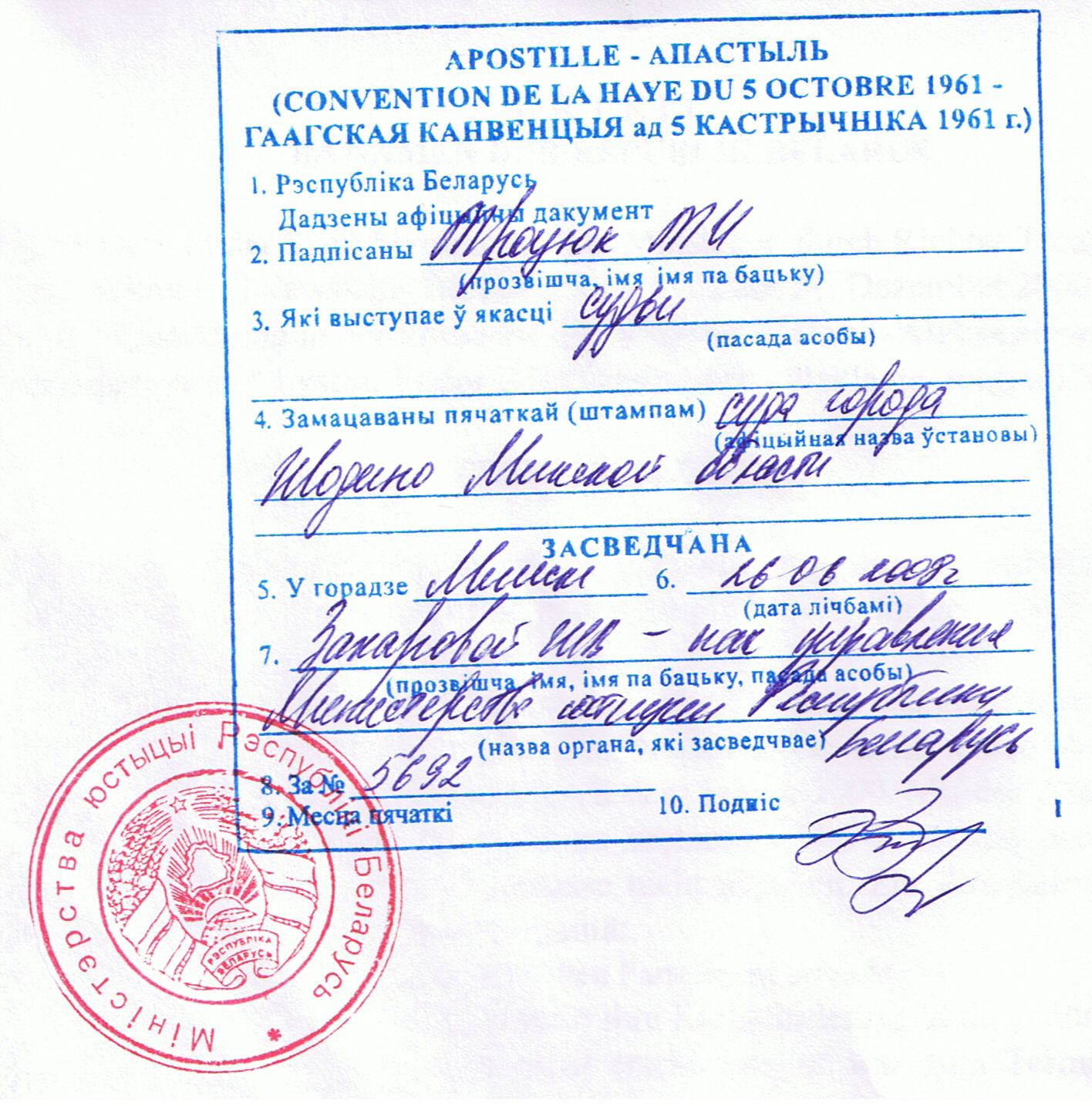
Belarus
Ministry of Justice

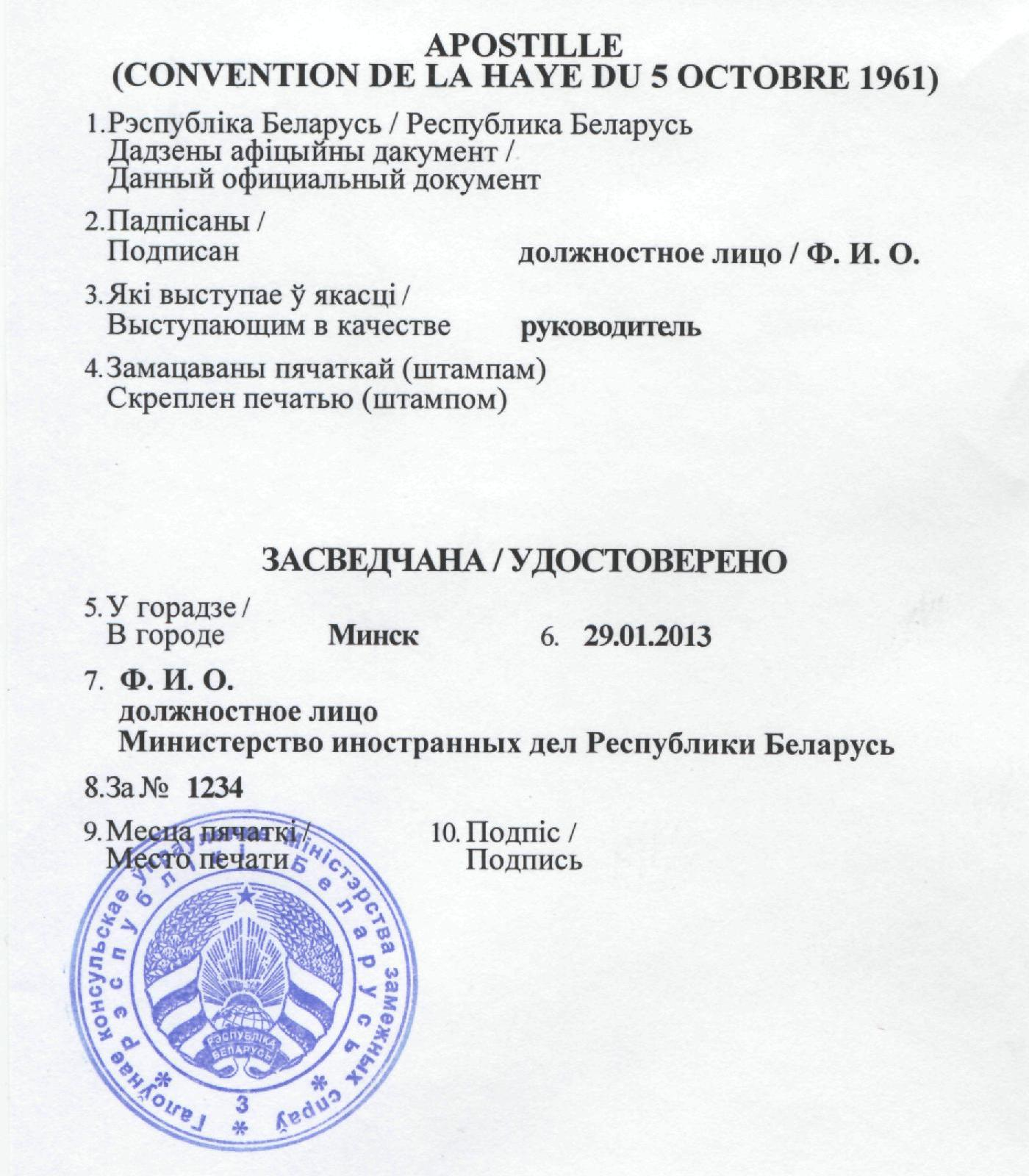
Belarus
Ministry of Foreign Affairs

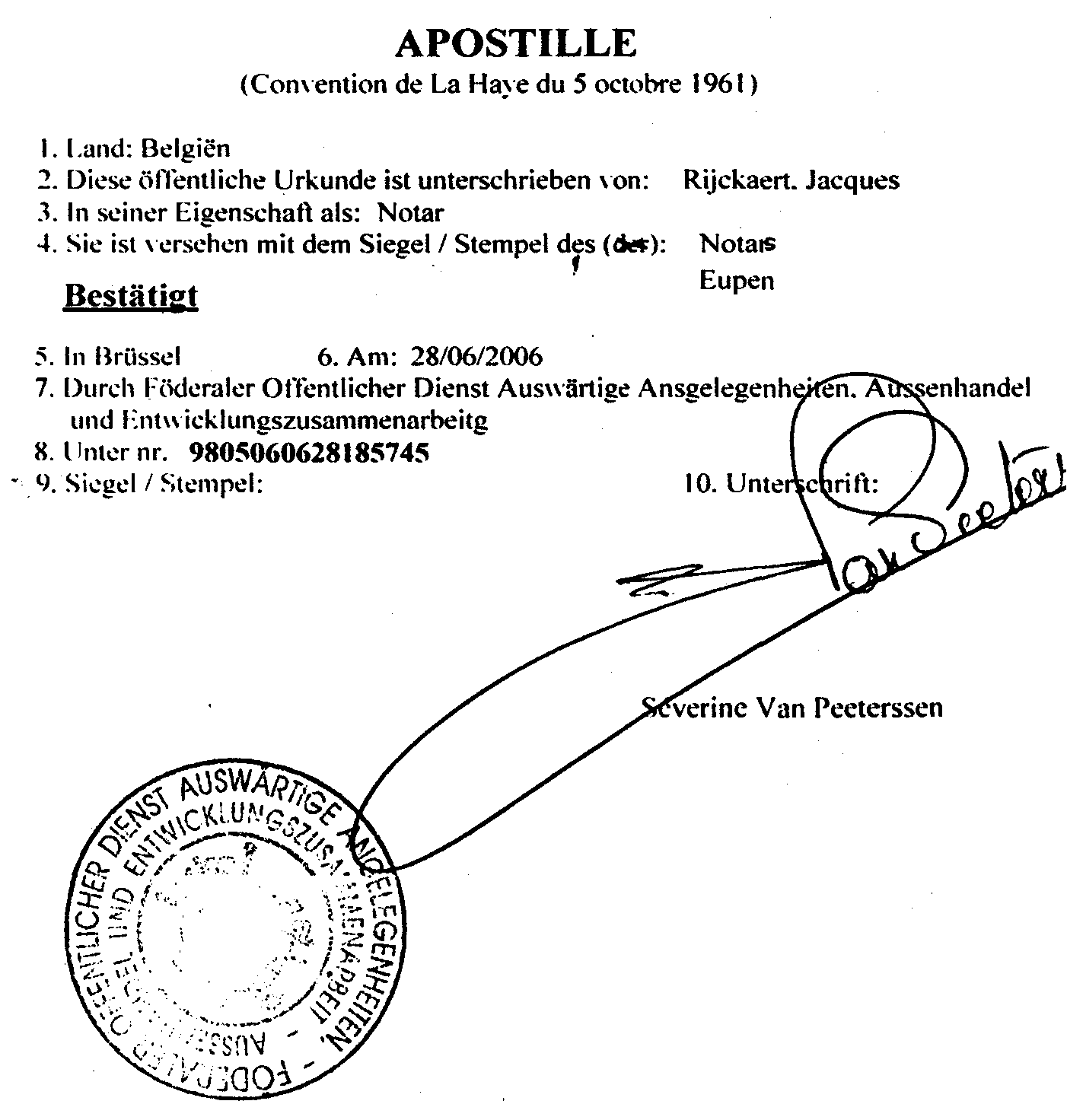
Belgium
Federal Public Service Foreign Affairs

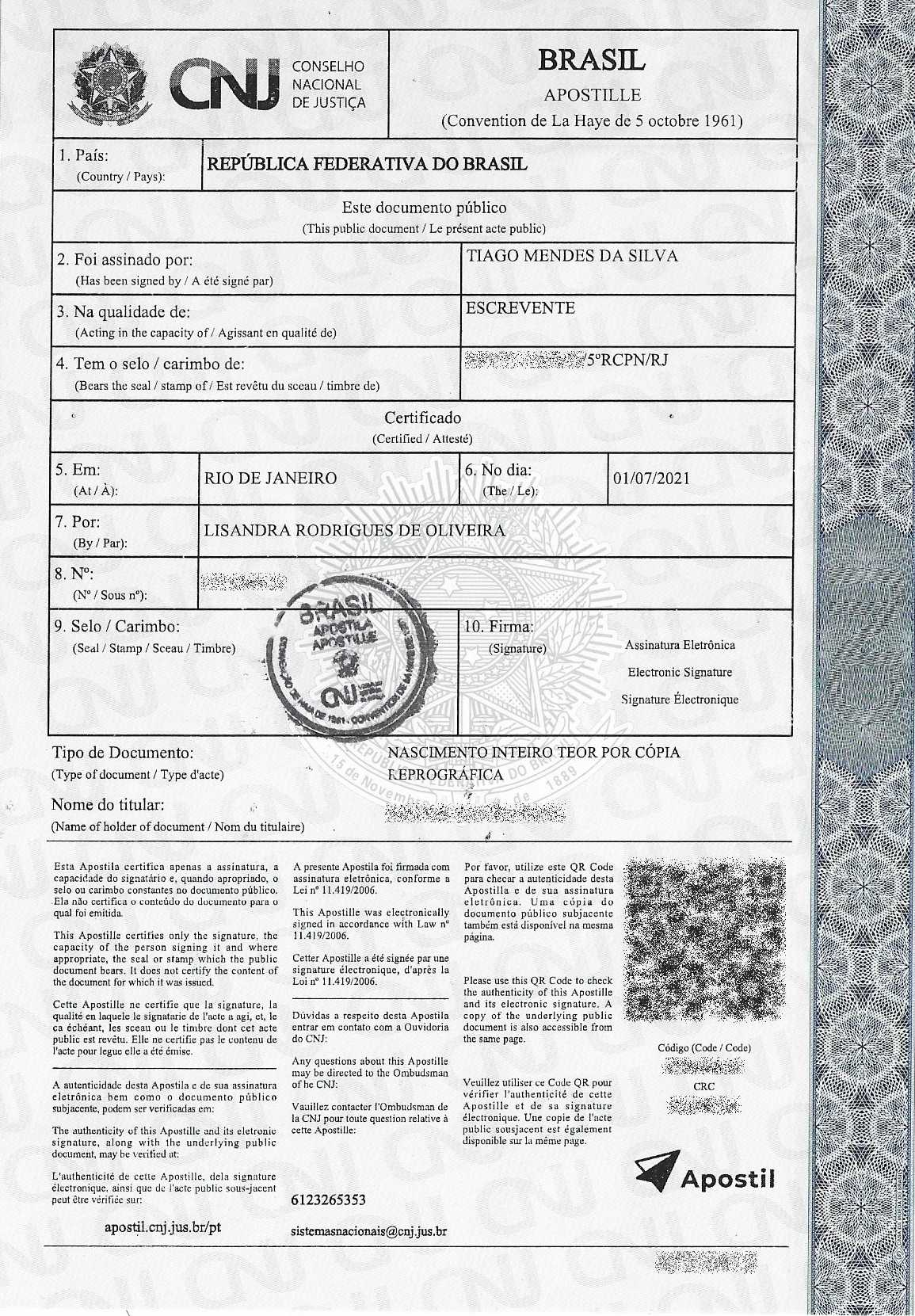
Brazil
Civil registry office in Rio de Janeiro

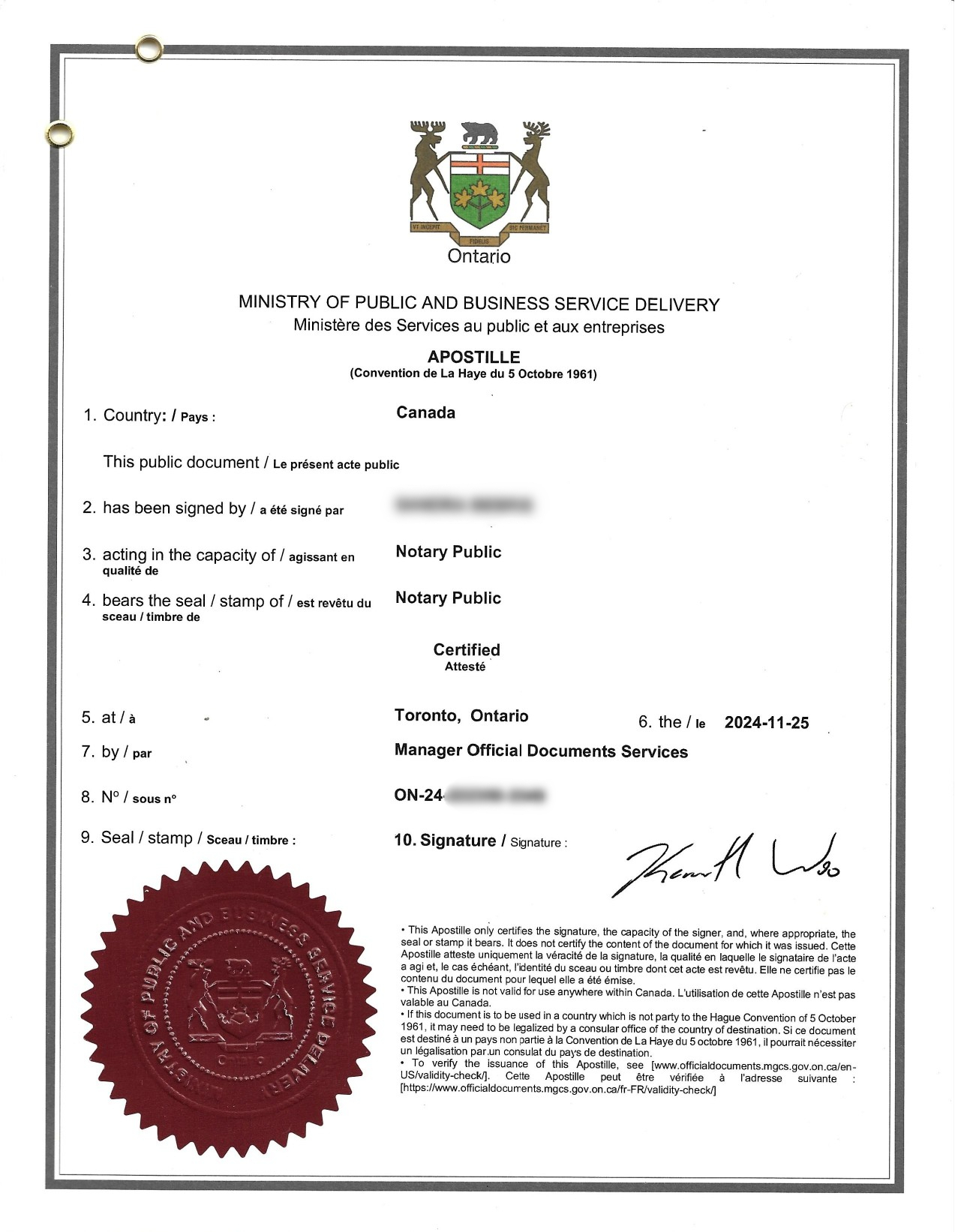
Canada
Ontario Ministry of Public and Business Service Delivery

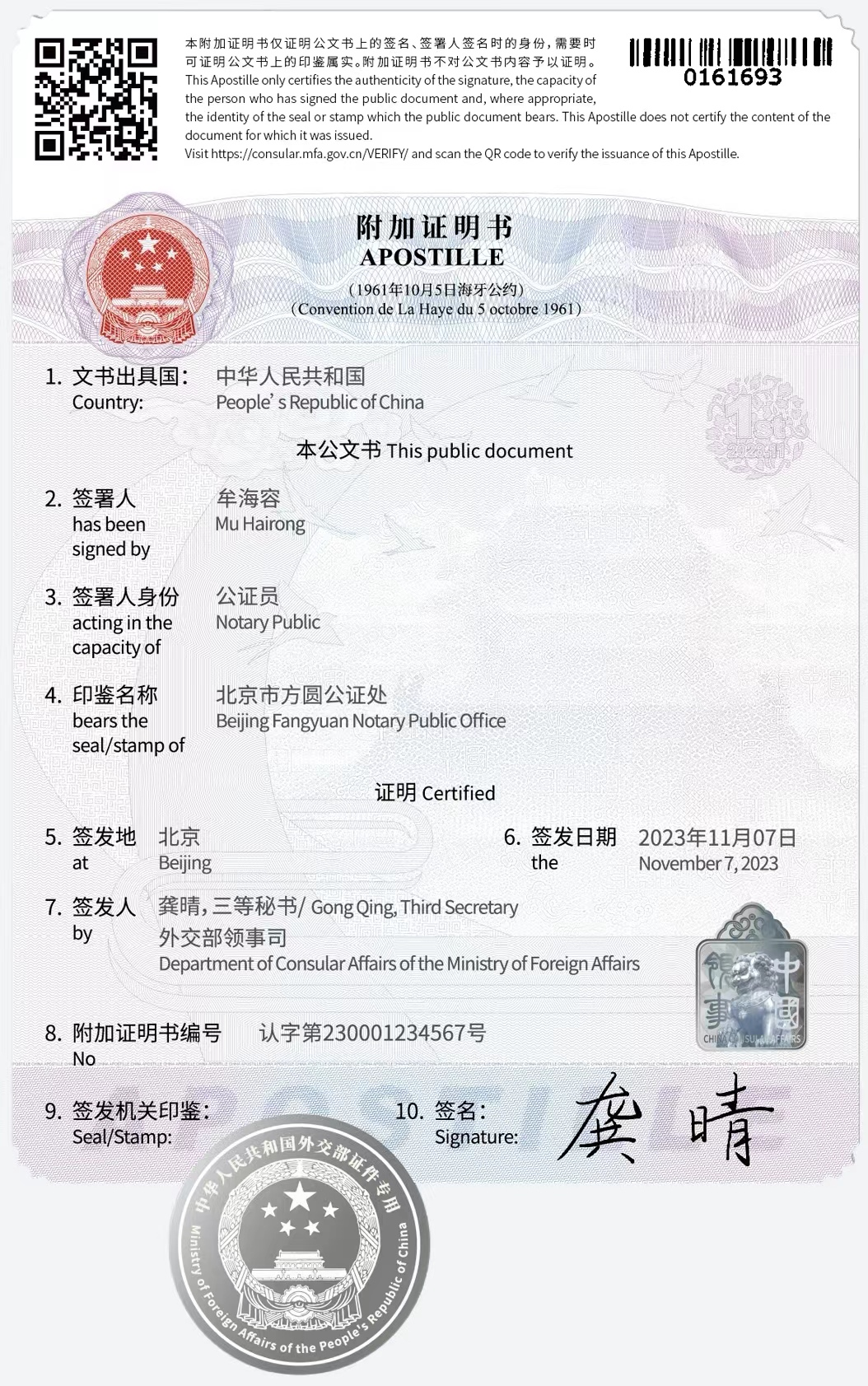
China
Ministry of Foreign Affairs

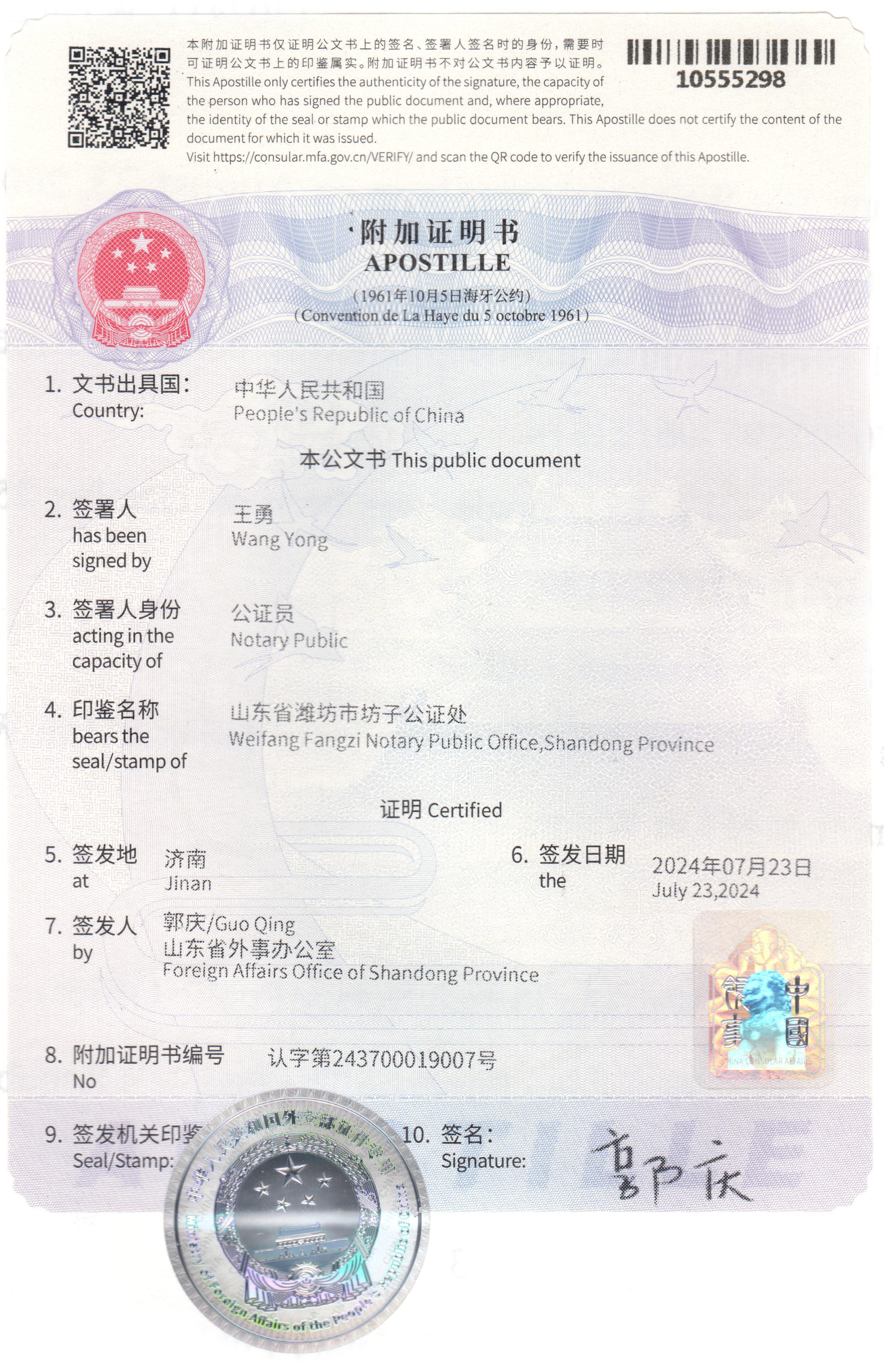
China
Shandong Foreign Affairs Office

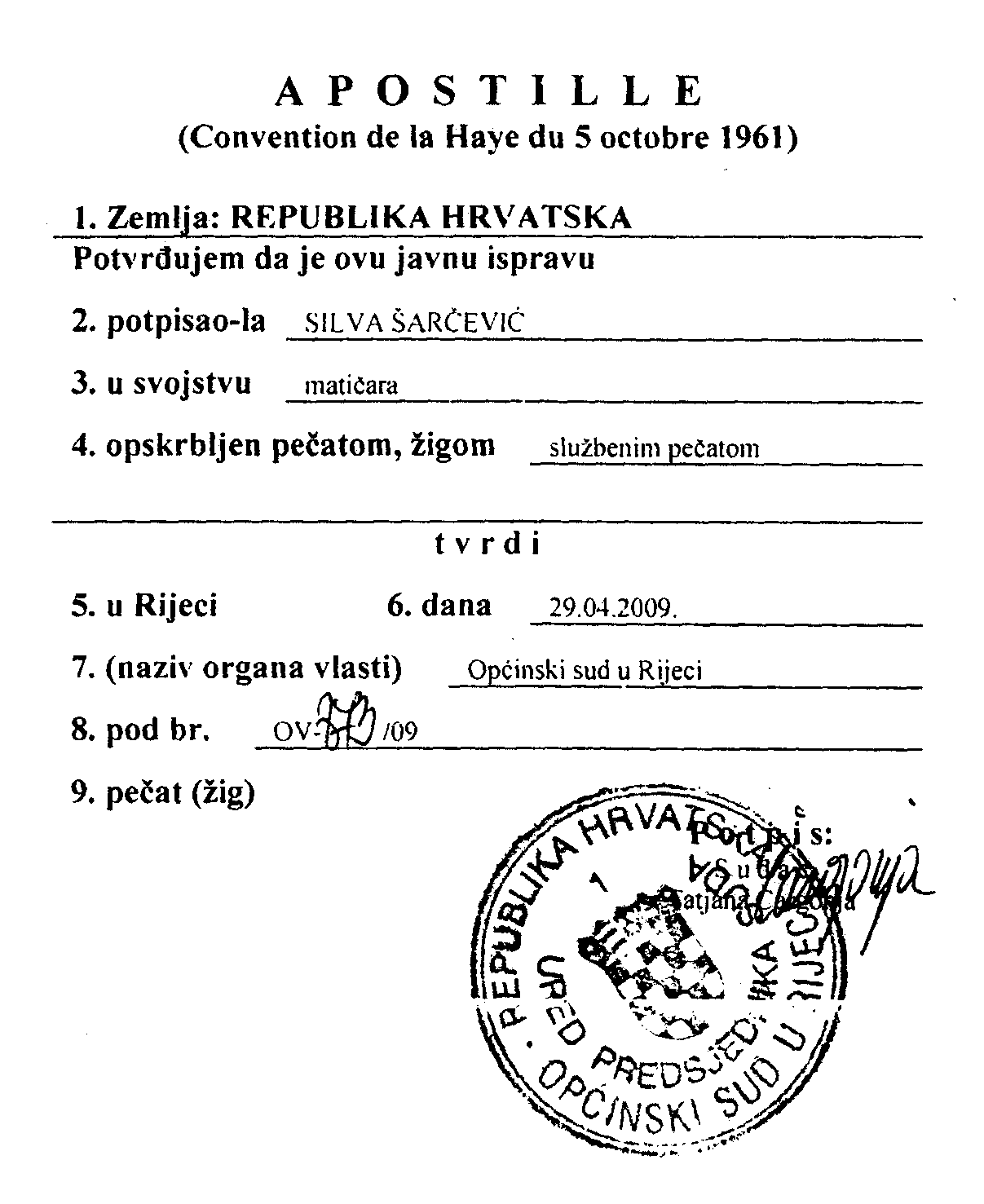
Croatia
Municipal Court in Rijeka

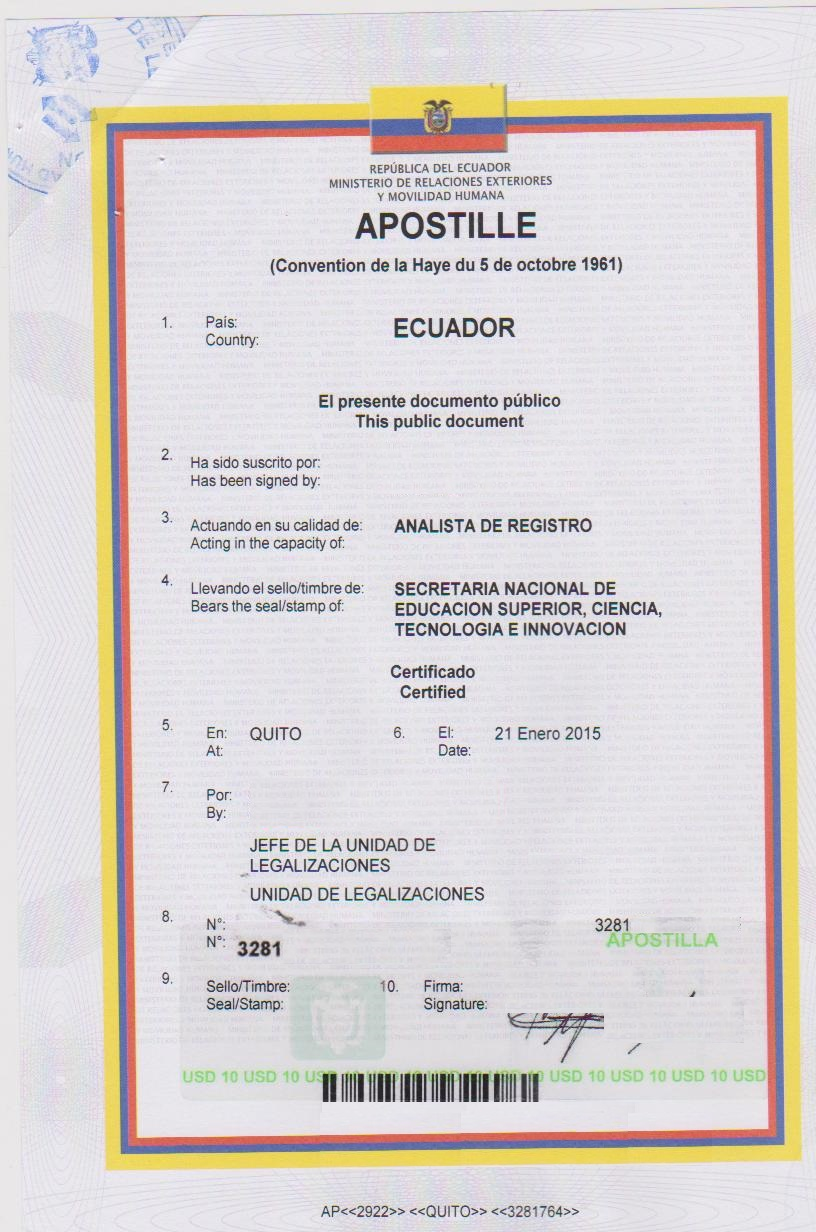
Ecuador
Ministry of Foreign Affairs and Human Mobility

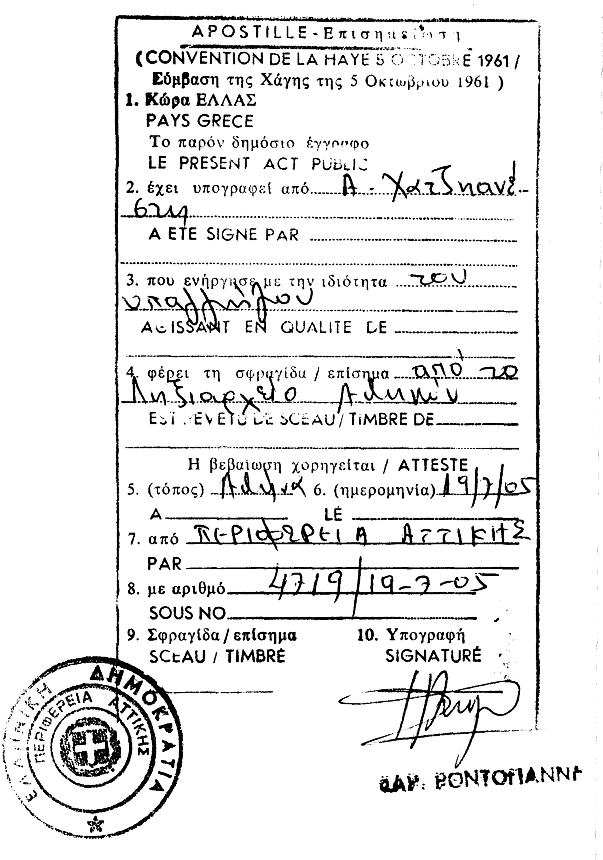
Greece
Attica

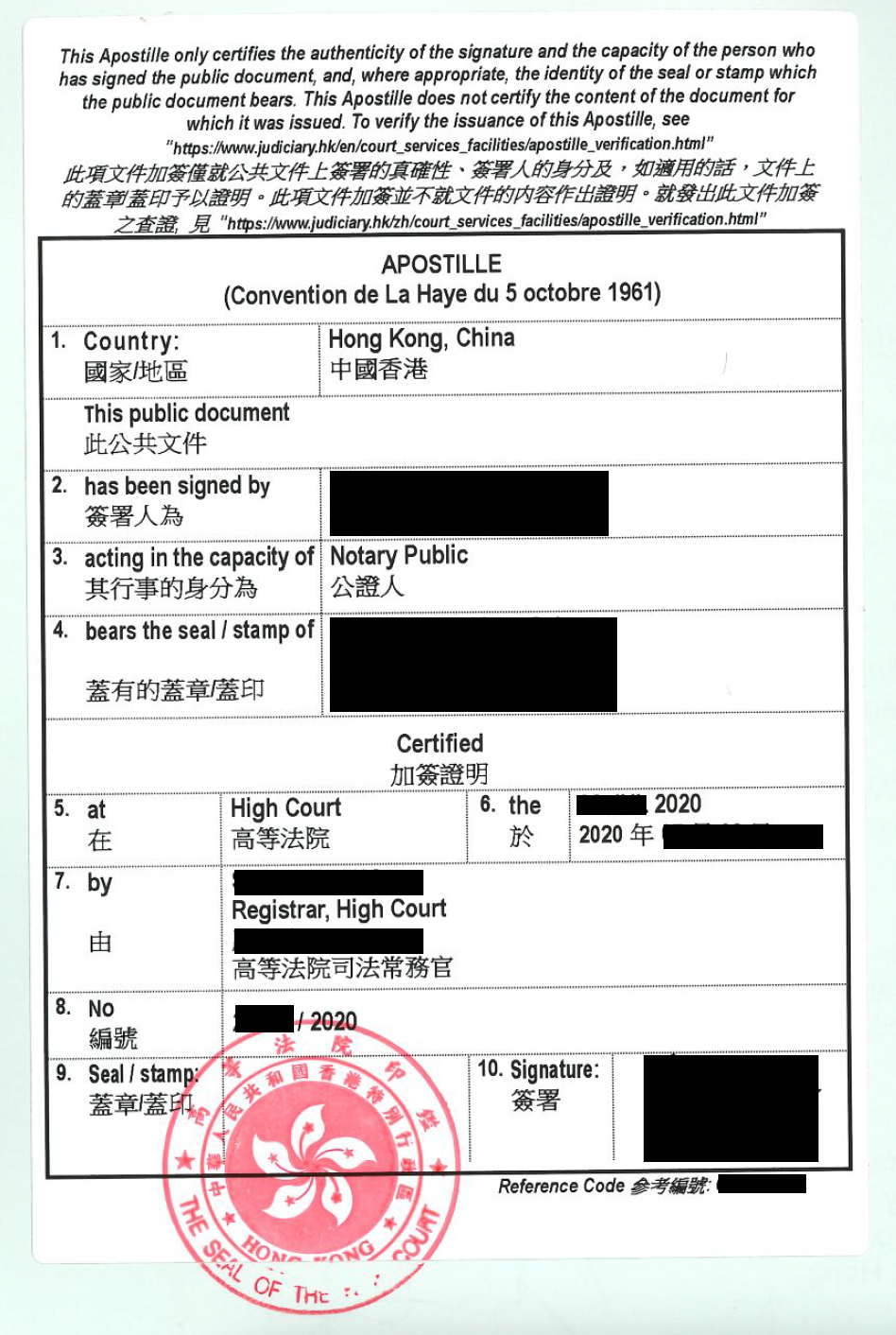
Hong Kong, China
High Court

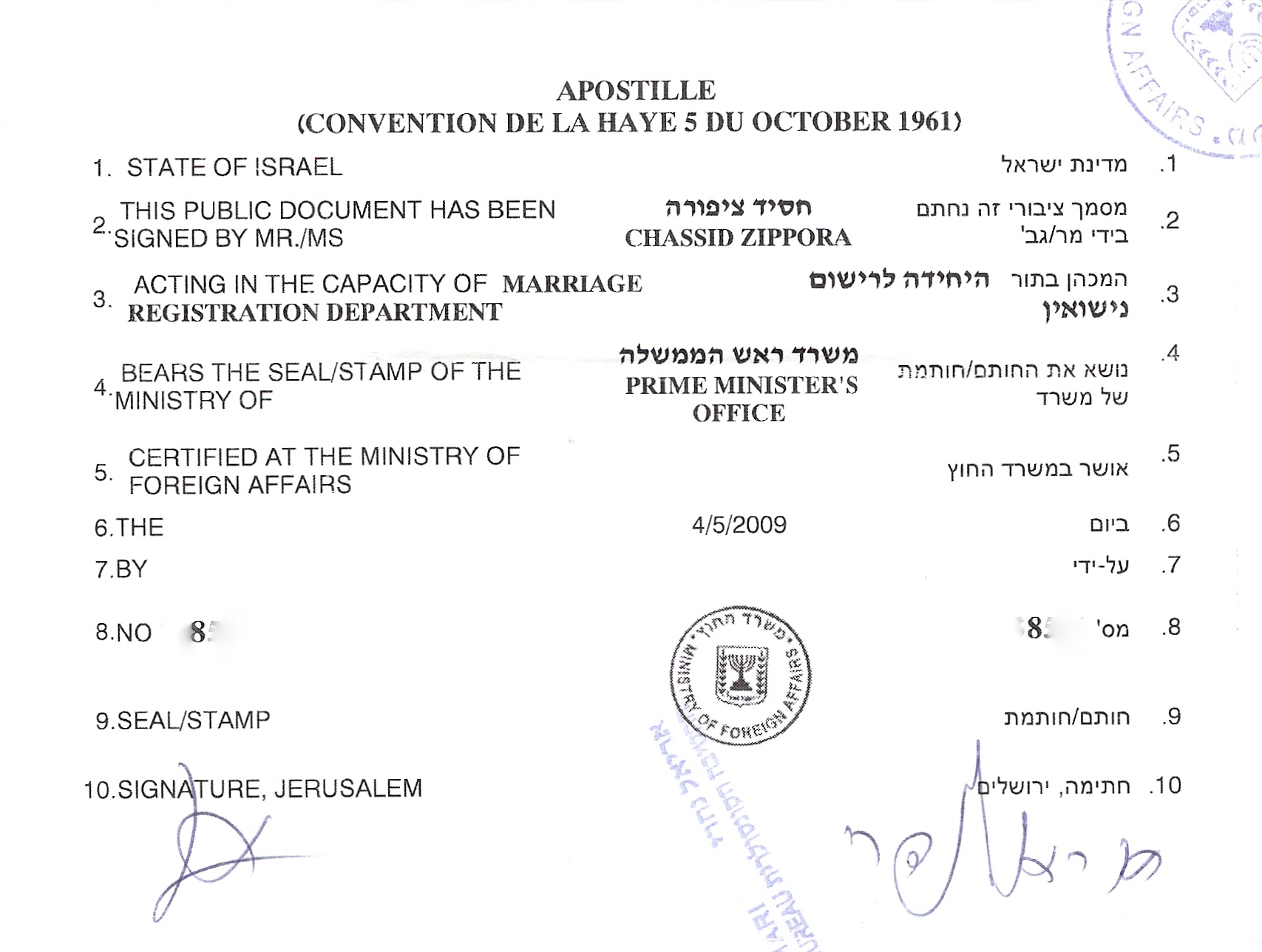
Israel
Ministry of Foreign Affairs

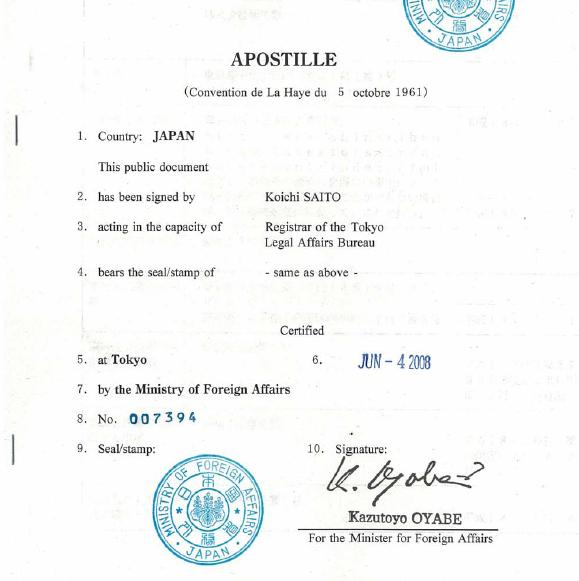
Japan
Ministry of Foreign Affairs

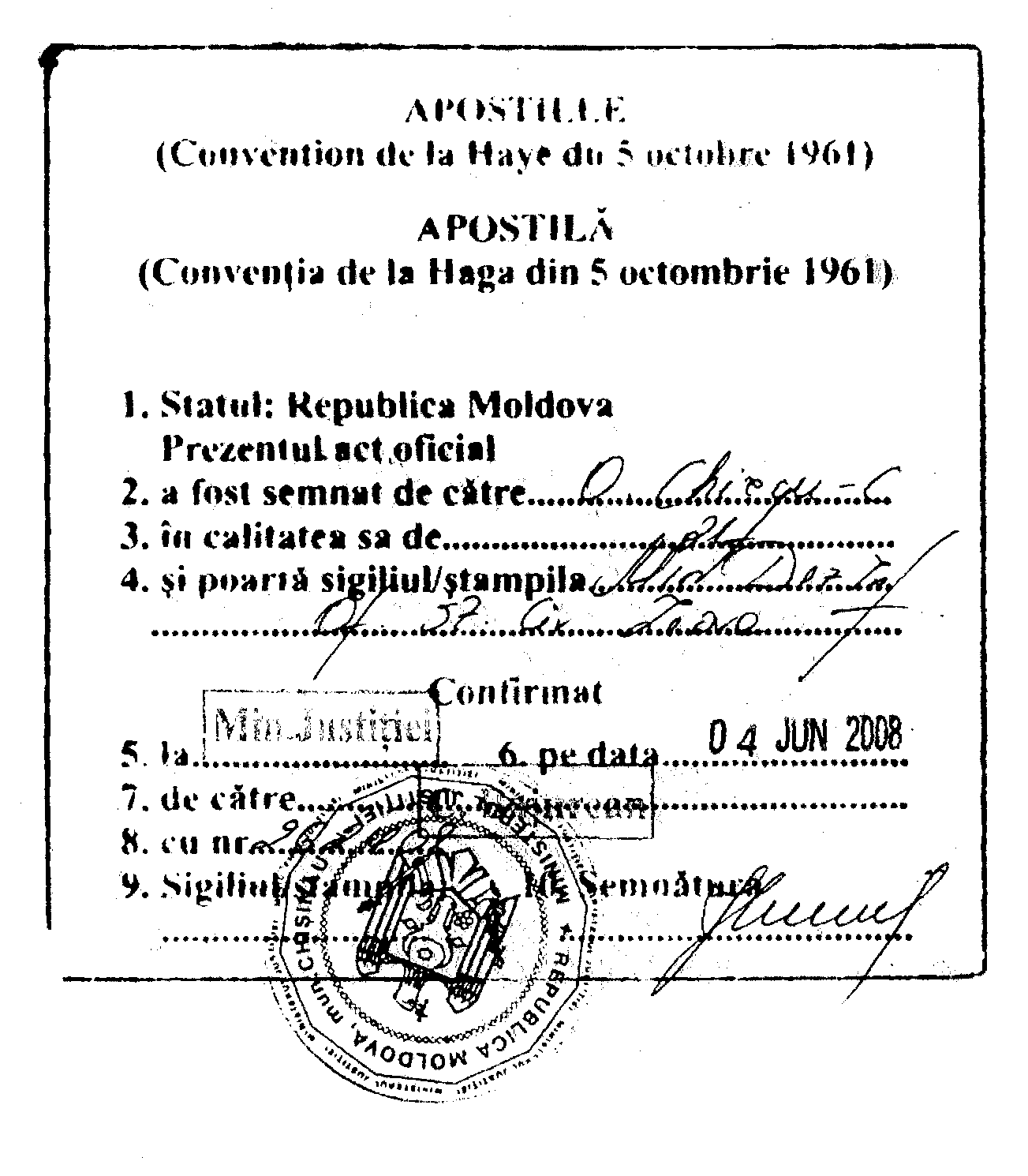
Moldova
Ministry of Justice

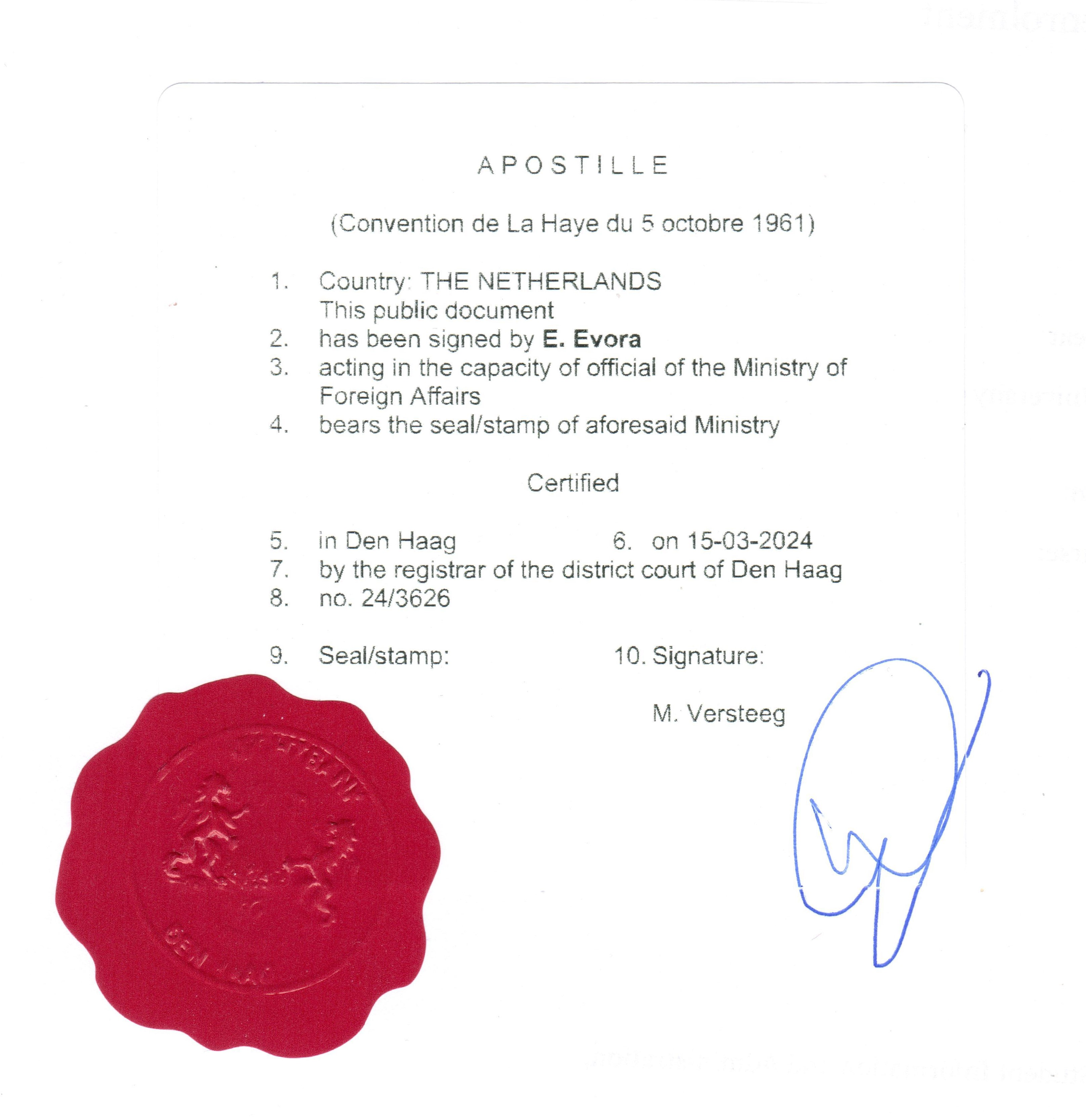
Netherlands
District court of The Hague

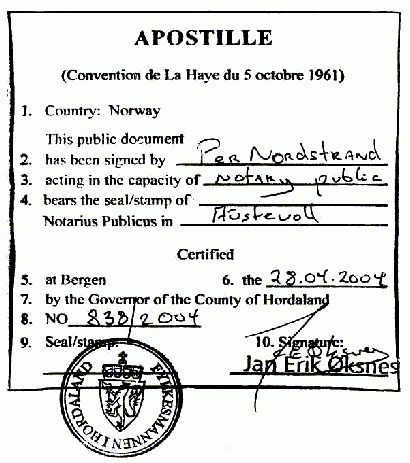
Norway
Governor of Hordaland

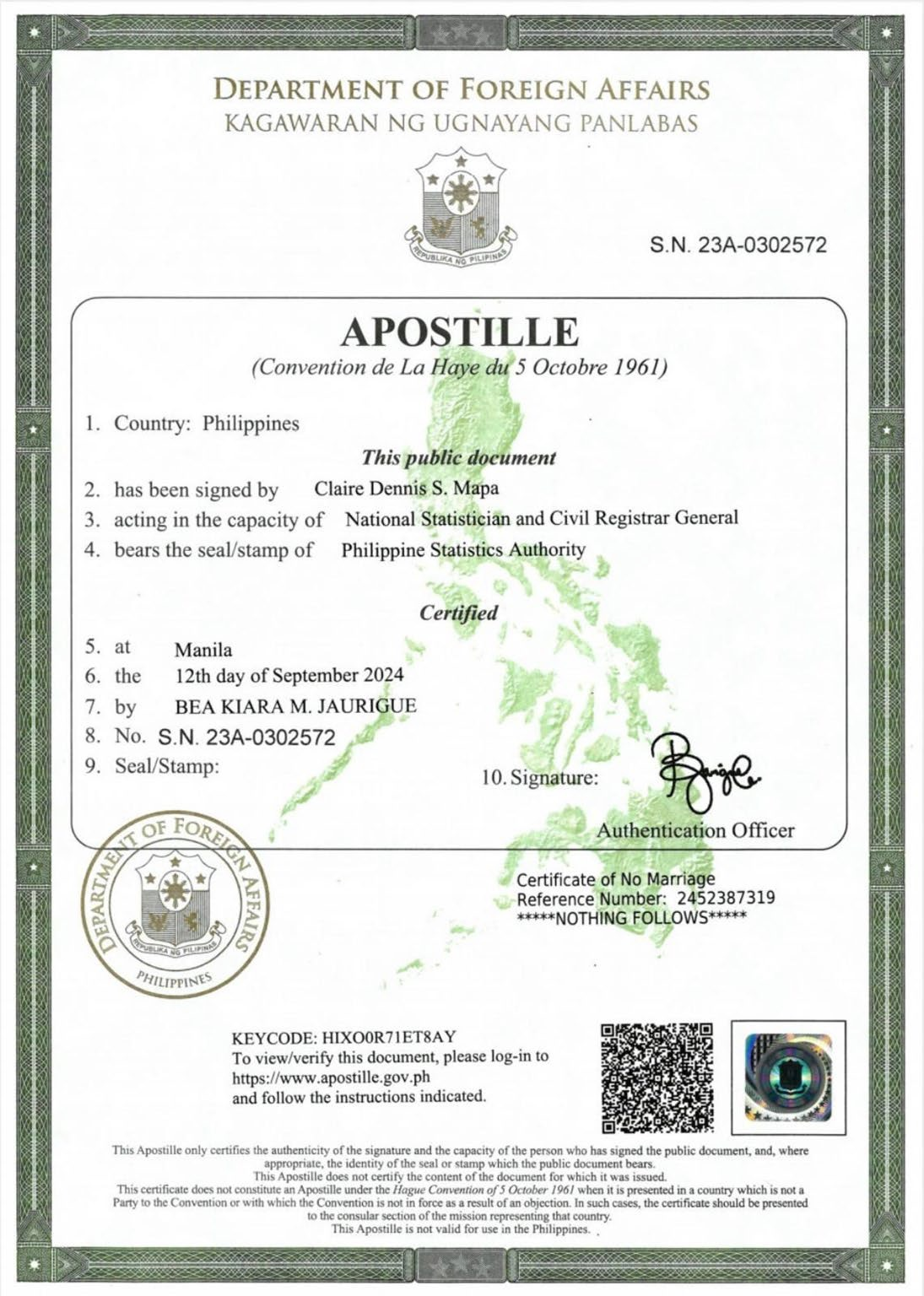
Philippines
Department of Foreign Affairs

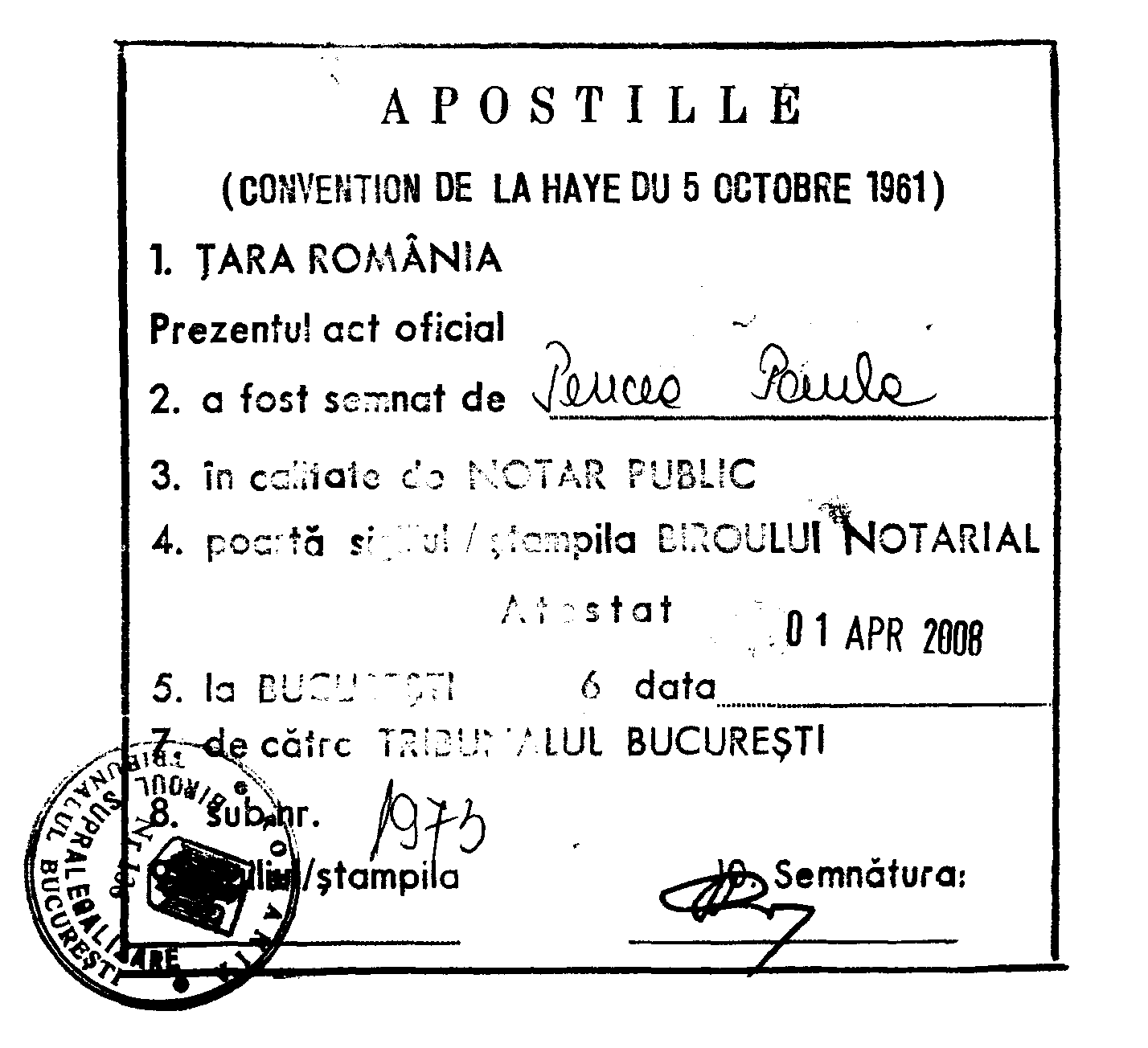
Romania
Court of Bucharest

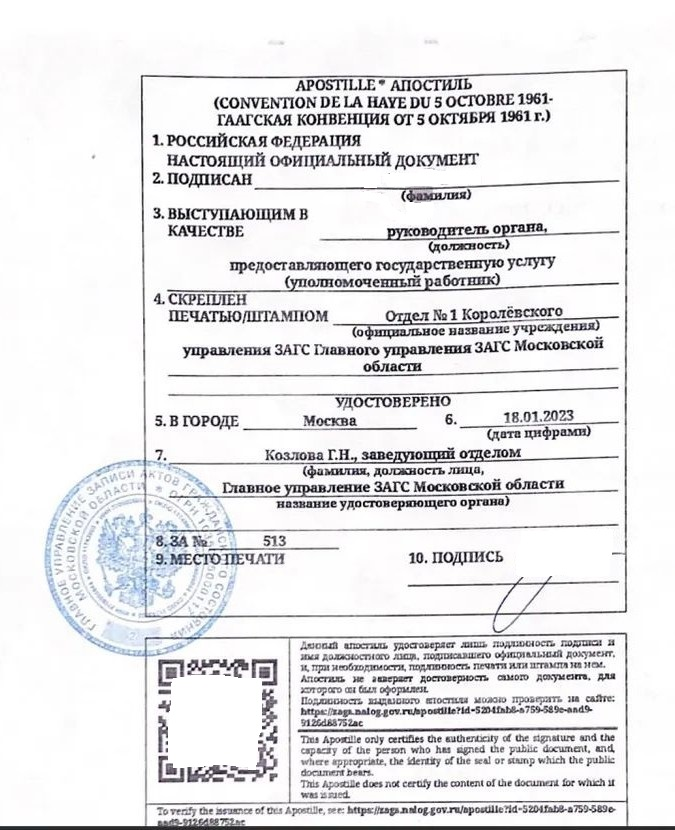
Russia
Main Directorate of Civil Registry of Moscow Region

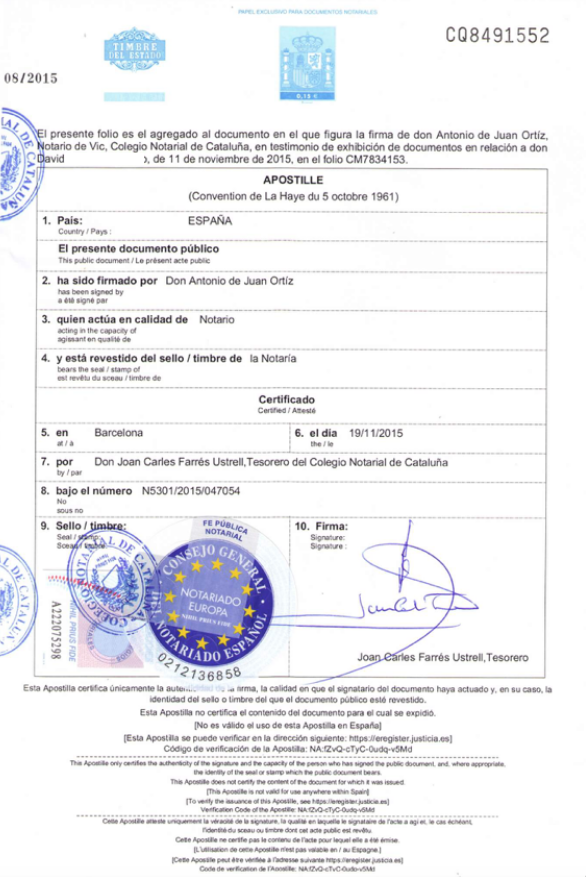
Spain
Notarial College of Catalonia

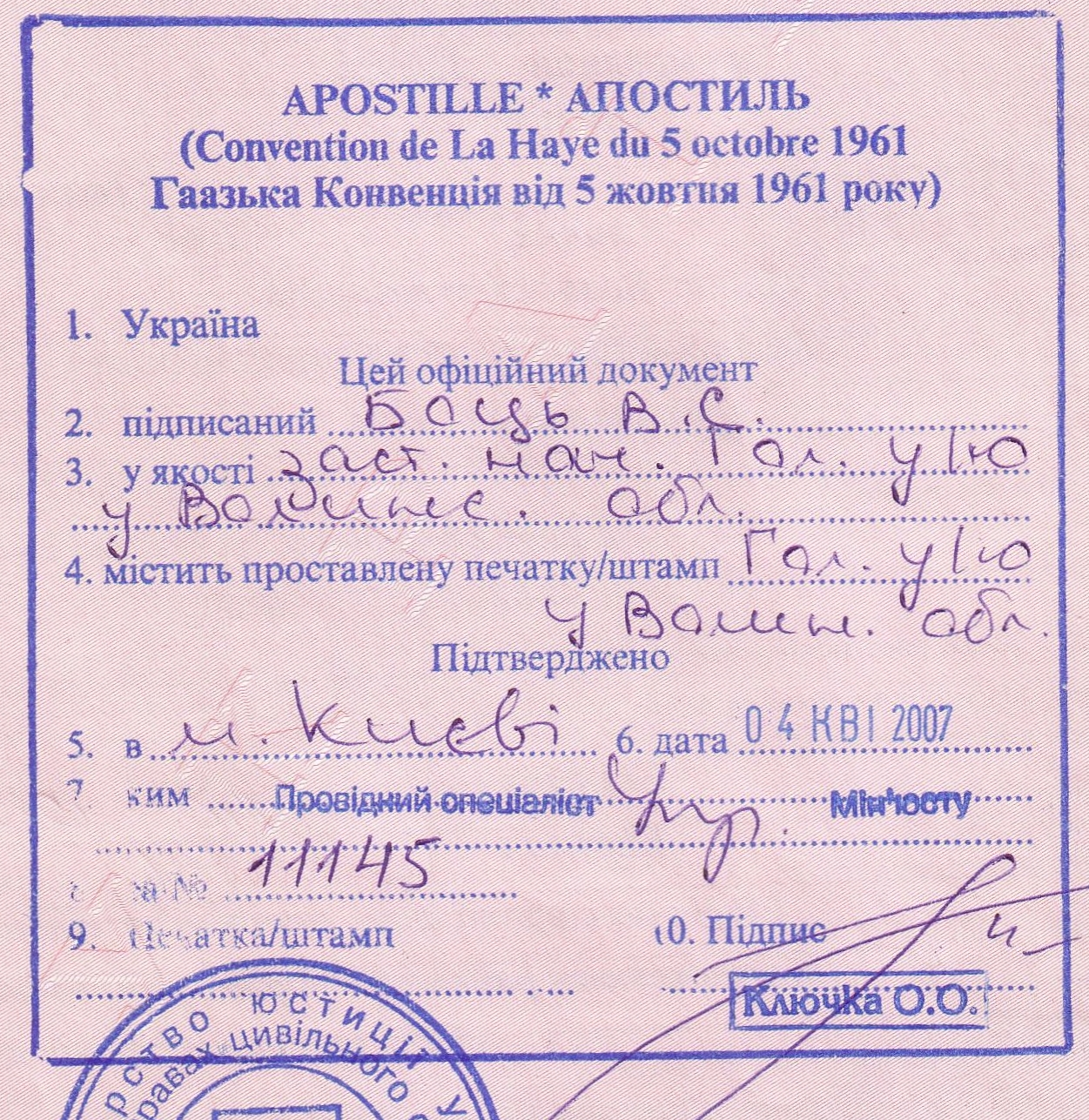
Ukraine
Ministry of Justice

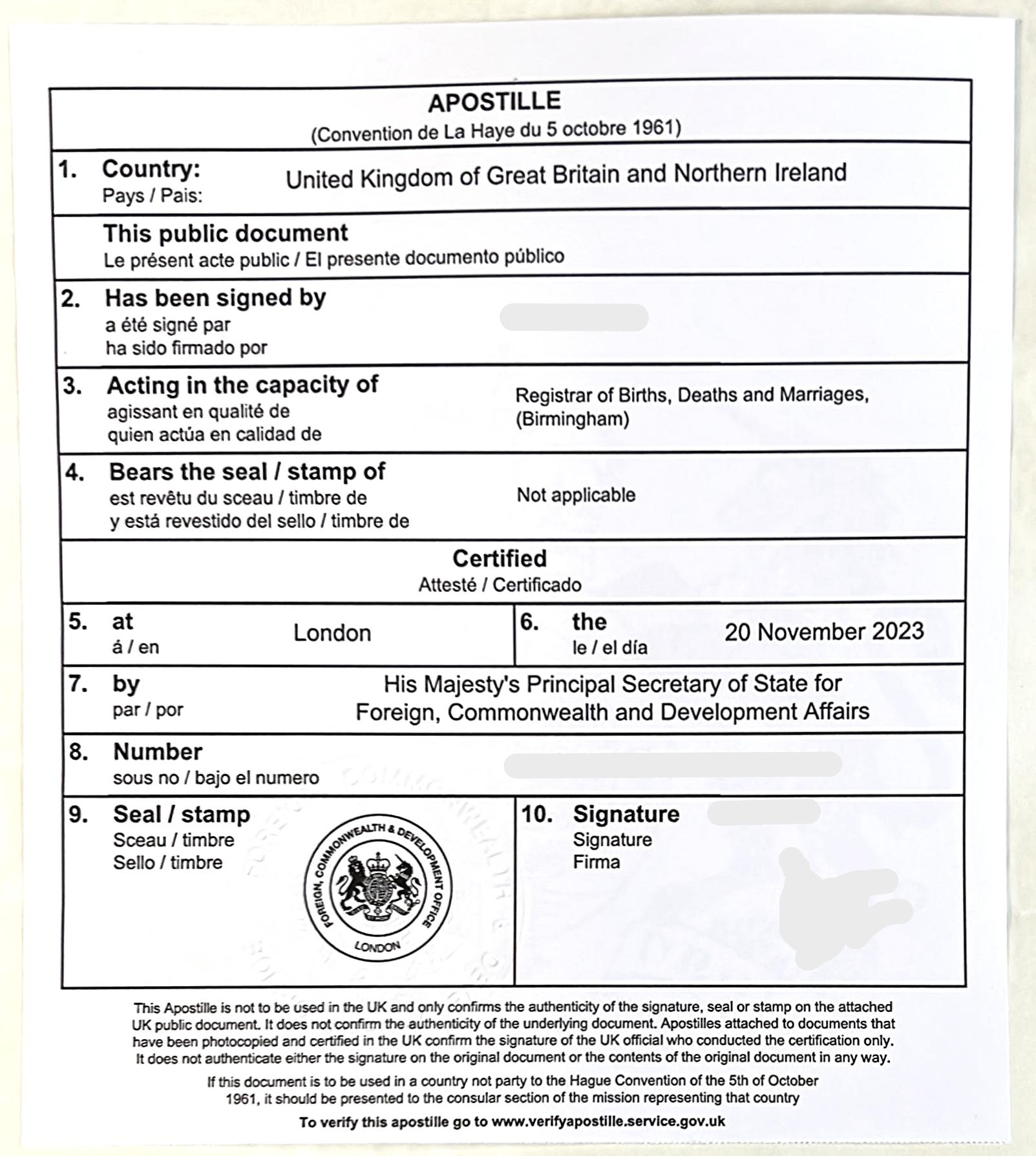
United Kingdom
Foreign, Commonwealth and Development Office

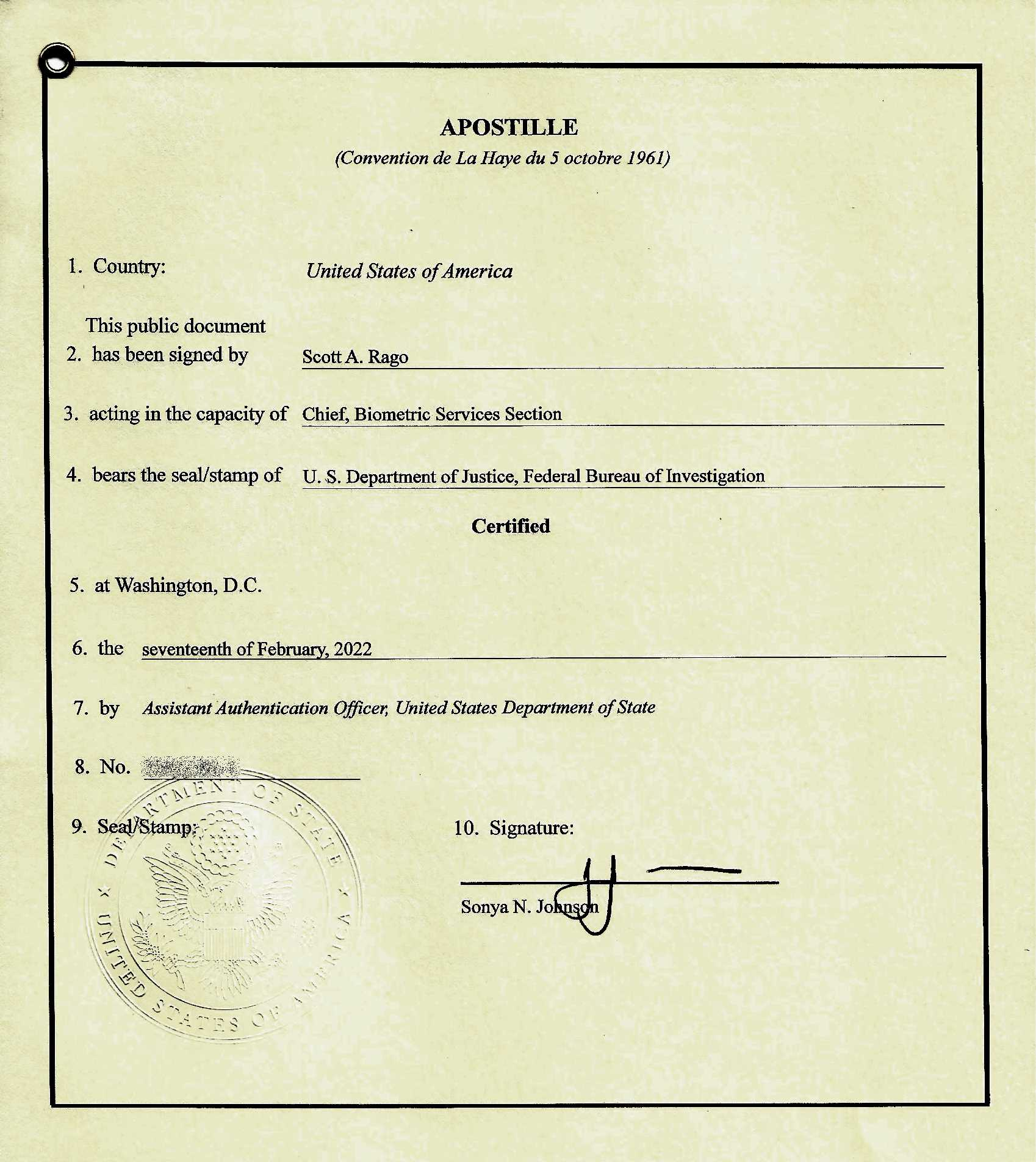
United States
U.S. Department of State

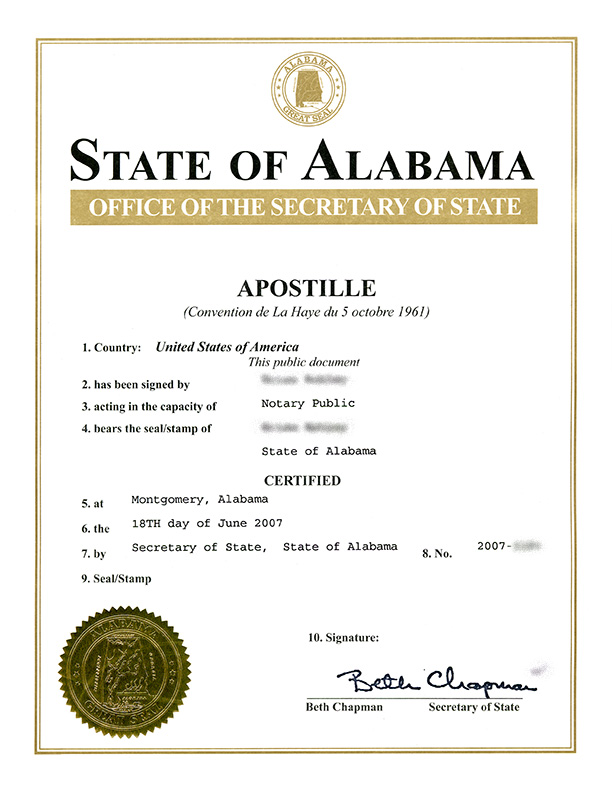
United States
Alabama Secretary of State

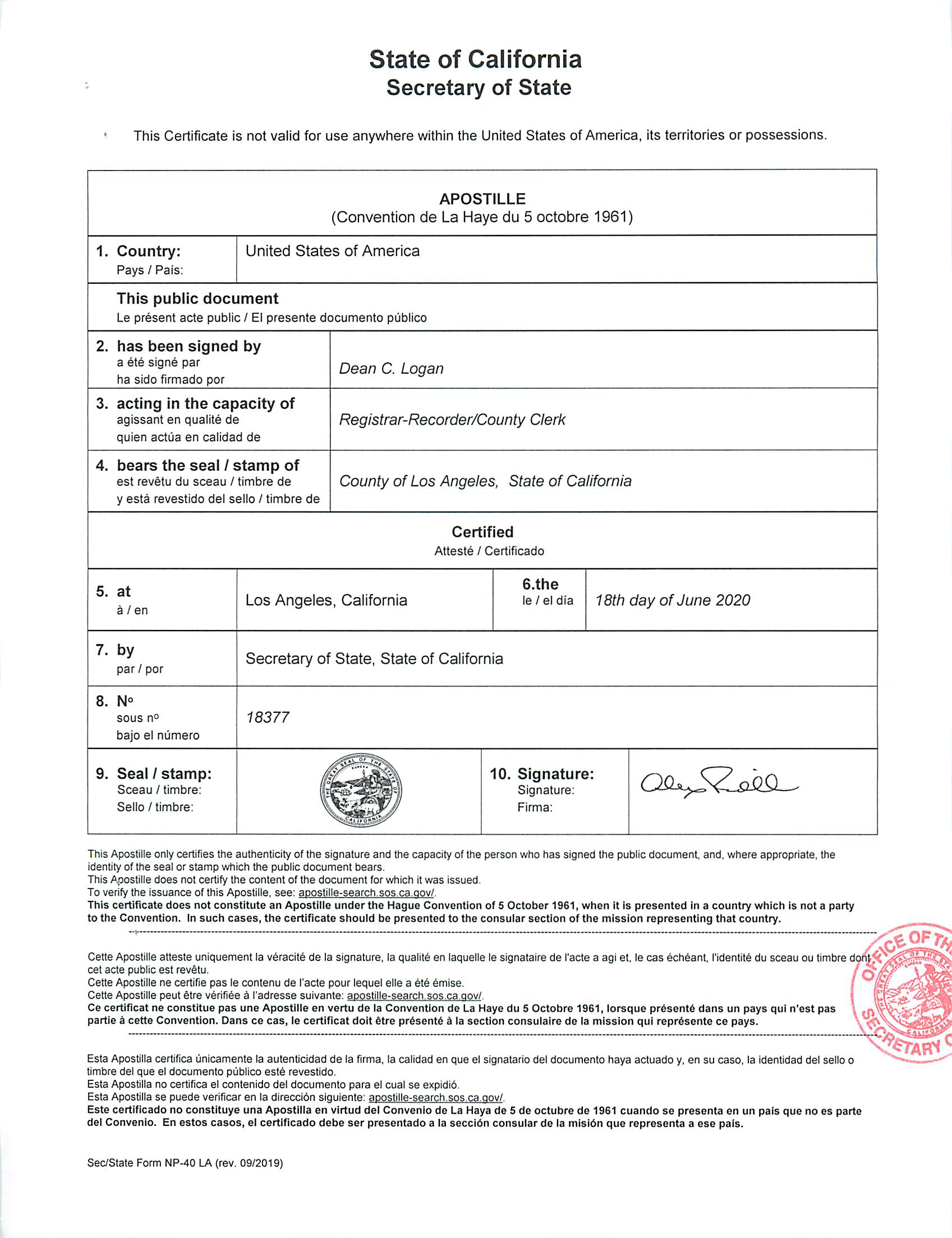
United States
California Secretary of State

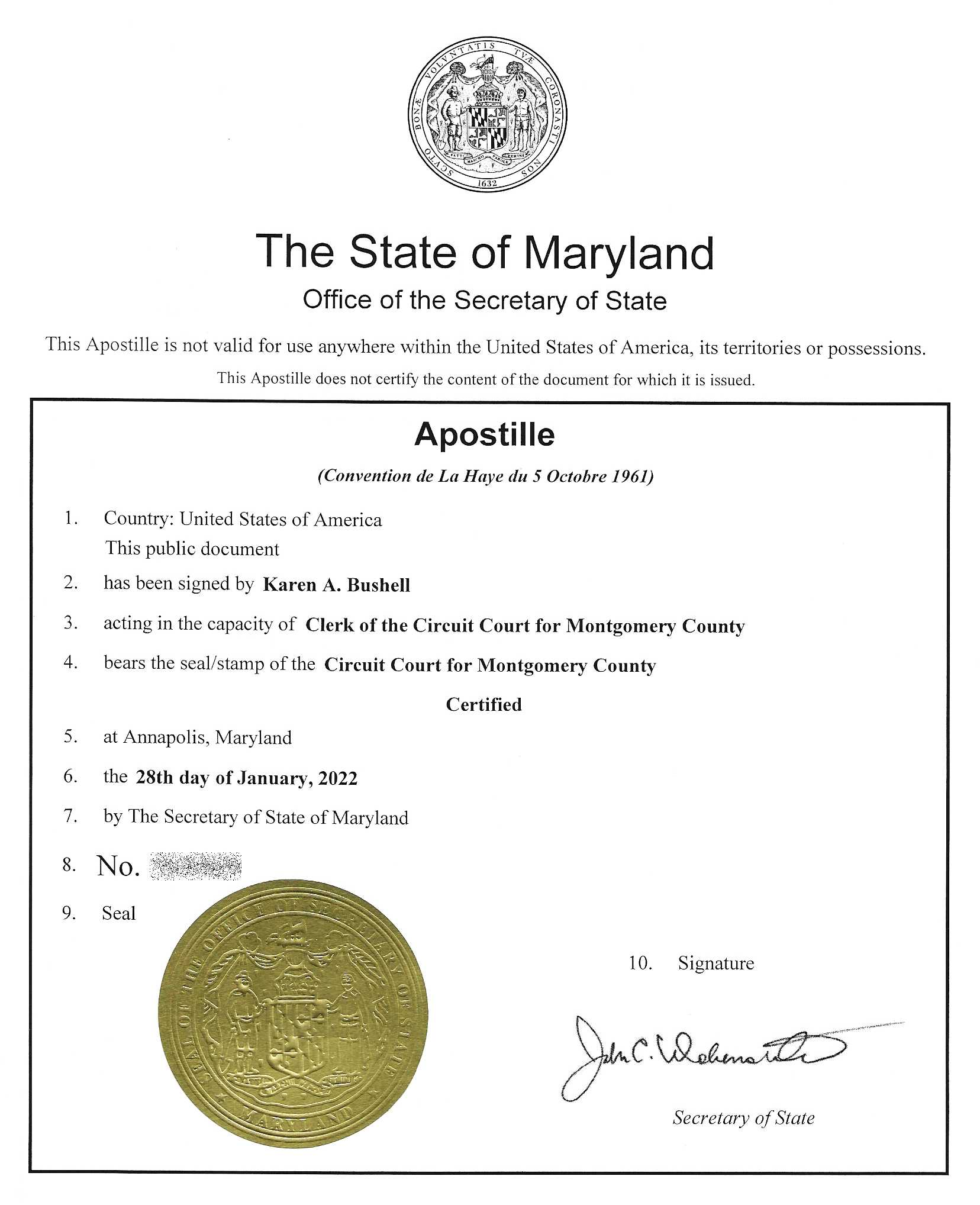
United States
Maryland Secretary of State

== See also ==
- Convention on the Issue of Multilingual Extracts from Civil Status Records
