= List of companies of Belgium =

Location of Belgium

Belgium is a sovereign state in Western Europe bordered by France, the Netherlands, Germany, Luxembourg, and the North Sea. It is a small, densely populated country which covers an area of 30,528 square kilometres (11,787 sq mi) and has a population of about 11 million people. Straddling the cultural boundary between Germanic and Latin Europe, Belgium is home to two main linguistic groups: the Dutch-speaking, mostly Flemish community, which constitutes about 59% of the population, and the French-speaking, mostly Walloon population, which comprises 41% of all Belgians. Additionally, there is a small group of German-speakers who live in the East Cantons located around the High Fens area, and bordering Germany.

Belgium's strongly globalized economy and its transport infrastructure are integrated with the rest of Europe. Its location at the heart of a highly industrialized region helped make it the world's 15th largest trading nation in 2007. The economy is characterized by a highly productive work force, high GNP and high exports per capita. Belgium's main imports are raw materials, machinery and equipment, chemicals, raw diamonds, pharmaceuticals, foodstuffs, transportation equipment, and oil products. Its main exports are machinery and equipment, chemicals, finished diamonds, metals and metal products, and foodstuffs.

For further information on the types of business entities in this country and their abbreviations, see "Business entities in Belgium".

== Largest firms ==
This list shows the one firm in the Fortune Global 500, which ranks firms by total revenues reported before 31 March 2024.

Rank	Image	Name	2024 revenues	Employees	Notes
231		Anheuser-Busch InBev	$59,380 million	154,540	The world's largest brewer with about 28% of the global market. The conglomerate has been on the list for 12 years, peaking at 196 in 2010.

== Notable firms ==
This list includes notable companies with primary headquarters located in the country. The industry and sector follow the Industry Classification Benchmark taxonomy. Organizations which have ceased operations are included and noted as defunct.

Notable companies Status: P=Private, S=State; A=Active, D=Defunct
Name	Industry	Sector	Headquarters	Founded	Notes	Status	
Abelag Aviation	Consumer services	Airlines	Zaventem	1964	Charter airline	P	A
Ablynx	Health care	Biotechnology	Ghent	2001	Biopharma	P	A
Ackermans & van Haaren	Conglomerates	-	Antwerp	1876	Construction, real estate, financial services	P	A
AG Real Estate	Financials	Real estate holding and development	Brussels	1824	Real estate	P	A
Ageas	Financials	Consumer finance	Brussels	1990	Financing	P	A
Agfa-Gevaert	Industrials	Electronic equipment	Mortsel	1867	Digital imaging and IT solutions	P	A
Agoria	Industrials	Business support services	Brussels	1946	Trade association	P	A
AIM Productions	Technology	Computer services	Hove	1994	IT	P	A
Alpro	Consumer goods	Food products	Ghent	1980	Soy products	P	A
Anheuser-Busch InBev	Consumer goods	Brewers	Leuven	2008	Breweries, distributors; see also InBev brands	P	A
Antwerp Water Works	Utilities	Water	Antwerp	1880	Water utility	P	A
Aquafin	Utilities	Water	Antwerp	1990	Wastewater	P	A
ASL Airlines Belgium	Industrials	Delivery services	Liège	1999	Cargo airline, part of ASL Airlines Ireland	P	A
Associated Weavers	Consumer goods	Clothing and accessories	Ronse	1964	Textile	P	A
Aveve	Consumer goods	Farming and fishing	Aalter	1890	Agriculture	P	A
Aviapartner	Industrials	Delivery services	Brussels	1949	Ground handling	P	A
Barco	Technology	Computer hardware	Kortrijk	1934	Display manufacturer	P	A
Base	Industrials	Business support services	Brussels	1993	Communications and design	P	A
Beaulieu International Group	Consumer goods	Clothing and accessories	Wielsbeke	1959	Textiles	P	A
Befimmo	Financials	Real estate holding and development	Brussels	1995	Real estate	P	A
Bekaert	Basic materials	Metal fabricating	Zwevegem	1880	Metal transformations and coatings	P	A
BekaertDeslee	Consumer goods	Clothing and accessories	Waregem	2016	Textile	P	A
BDO	Industrials	Business support services	Zaventem	1963	Auditors	P	A
Bpost	Industrials	Delivery services	Brussels	2000	Postal services	P	A
Brussels Airlines	Consumer services	Airlines	Brussels	2006	Flag carrier airline, part of Lufthansa (Germany)	P	A
Brussels Regional Investment Company	Financials	Specialty finance	Brussels	1984	Financing	P	A
Cockerill Sambre	Basic materials	Iron and steel	Seraing	1817	Partially defunct in 1998	P	A
Carmeuse	Basic materials	General mining	Louvain-la-Neuve	1860	Lime and limestone mining	P	A
Cavalier Chocolate	Consumer goods	Food products	Eeklo	1996	Chocolatier	P	A
Claeys	Industrials	Commercial vehicles and trucks	Zedelgem	1906	Farm equipment, defunct 1991	P	D
Cofinimmo	Financials	Real estate services	Brussels	1983	Real estate	P	A
Colruyt Group	Consumer services	Food retailers and wholesalers	Halle	1925	Retail, supermarkets	P	A
Compagnie Maritime Belge	Industrials	Marine transportation	Antwerp	1895	Shipping	P	A
Confiserie Roodthooft	Consumer goods	Food products	Antwerp	1925	Confectioner	P	A
Copiepresse	Consumer services	Publishing	Brussels	2000	Newspaper	P	A
Deceuninck	Basic materials	Commodity chemicals	Hooglede	1937	PVC	P	A
Delhaize Group	Consumer goods	Food products	Brussels	1867	Food	P	A
DEME	Industrials	Heavy construction	Zwijndrecht	1991	Infrastructure	P	A
D'Ieteren	Consumer services	Specialized consumer services	Brussels	1805	Automotive services	P	A
DOMO Group	Consumer goods	Clothing and accessories	Ghent	1992	Textiles	P	A
Ecover	Consumer goods	Nondurable household products	Malle	1979	Cleaning products	P	A
ETAP Lighting	Consumer goods	Building materials and fixtures	Malle	1949	Lighting	P	A
Eurogentec	Health care	Biotechnology	Seraing	1985	Biotech	P	A
EVS Broadcast Equipment	Technology	Telecommunications equipment	Liège	1994	Broadcasting equipment	P	A
Ferranti Computer Systems	Technology	Computer hardware	Antwerp	1976	Computers, previously a part of Ferranti (UK)	P	A
Fluxys	Oil and gas	Exploration and production	Brussels	2001	Natural gas, subsidiary of Suez	P	A
FN Browning Group	Industrials	Defense	Herstal	1889	Firearms	P	A
Forrest Group	Basic materials	General mining	Wavre	1922	Mining	P	A
Gimv	Financials	Equity investment instruments	Brussels	1980	Investing	P	A
Godiva Chocolatier	Consumer goods	Food products	Brussels	1926	Chocolatier	P	A
Group Joos	Consumer services	Publishing	Turnhout	1935	Printing, document management	P	A
Groupe Bruxelles Lambert	Industrials	Diversified industrials	Brussels	1902	Industrial holdings	P	A
Guylian	Consumer goods	Food products	Sint-Niklaas	1960	Chocolatier	P	A
IMEC	Technology	Computer services	Leuven	1984	Technology research center	P	A
Impéria Automobiles	Consumer goods	Automobiles	Liège	1906	Automotive, defunct	P	D
Innogenetics	Health care	Biotechnology	Ghent	1985	Diagnostics, IVD	P	A
Jan De Nul	Industrials	Building materials and fixtures	Aalst	1938	Construction, maritime maintenance	P	A
Janssen Pharmaceutica	Health care	Pharmaceuticals	Beerse	1953	Pharma, subsidiary of Johnson & Johnson	P	A
Jonckheere	Industrials	Commercial vehicles and trucks	Roeselare	1881	Buses	P	A
Jules Destrooper	Consumer goods	Food products	Lo-Reninge	1886	Biscuits	P	A
Katoen Natie	Industrials	Delivery services	Antwerp	1854	Logistics	P	A
KBC Bank	Financials	Banks	Brussels	1985	Bank	P	A
Keytrade Bank	Financials	Investment services	Brussels	1998	Investments	P	A
Lhoist group	Extraction	Lime, dolime and mineral solutions	Ottignies-Louvain-la-Neuve	1924	Raw materials	P	A
Libeco-Lagae	Consumer goods	Clothing and accessories	Meulebeke	1997	Textiles	P	A
Louis Delhaize Group	Consumer services	Food retailers and wholesalers	Charleroi	1875	Retail, supermarkets	P	A
Luciad NV	Technology	Computer services	Leuven	1999	Geographic Information Systems (GIS)	P	A
Materialise NV	Technology	Computer services	Leuven	1990	3D printing solutions	P	A
Metallo-Chimique	Basic materials	Nonferrous metals	Beerse	1919	Mining	P	A
Mutoh Europe nv	Consumer goods	Consumer electronics	Ostend	1990	Electronics	P	A
Namahn	Industrials	Business support services	Brussels	1987	Design consulting	P	A
National Railway Company of Belgium	Consumer services	Rail transport	Brussels	1926	Passenger rail	S	A
Compagnie Nationale à Portefeuille (CNP)	Industrials	Diversified industrials	Gerpinnes	1981	Industrial holding	P	A
Nyrstar	Basic materials	General mining	Balen	2007	Mining	P	A
Option N.V.	Technology	Computer hardware	Leuven	1986	Wireless technology	P	A
Proost	Consumer services	Publishing	Turnhout	1913	Book publishing	P	A
Proximus	Telecommunications	Mobile telecommunications	Brussels	1994	Mobile network, part of Proximus Group	P	A
Proximus Group	Telecommunications	Fixed line telecommunications	Brussels	1930	State-owned telecommunications	S	A
Regional Investment Company of Wallonia	Financials	Investment services	Liège	1979	Investments	P	A
Reynaers Aluminium	Basic materials	Aluminum	Duffel	1965	Aluminium	P	A
RHJ International	Financials	Asset managers	Brussels	1786	Financial services group	P	A
Ridley Bikes	Consumer goods	Recreational products	Paal	1997	Bicycles	P	A
Saluc	Consumer goods	Recreational products	Péruwelz	1923	Ball manufacturing	P	A
Septentrio	Consumer goods	Consumer electronics	Leuven	2000	Electronics	P	A
Seyntex	Consumer goods	Clothing and accessories	Oostrozebeke	1908	Textiles	P	A
Skytech	Industrials	Aerospace	Brussels	1989	Helicopters	P	A
Sofina	Financials	Equity investment instruments	Brussels	1898	Investing	P	A
Solvay S.A.	Basic materials	Specialty chemicals	Brussels	1863	Industrial chemicals	P	A
Soudal	Basic materials	Specialty chemicals	Turnhout	1966	Silicone	P	A
Sugar refinery of Tienen	Consumer goods	Food products	Tienen	1836	Sugar	P	A
Syensqo	Basic materials	Specialty chemicals	Brussels	2023	Chemicals, advanced materials	P	A
Telenet	Telecommunications	Fixed line telecommunications	Mechelen	1996	Broadband cable	P	A
Teleroute	Industrials	Delivery services	Brussels	1985	Freight	P	A
Thermote & Vanhalst	Industrials	Commercial vehicles and trucks	Waregem	1969	Spare parts, accessories	P	A
Thomas Cook Airlines Belgium	Consumer services	Airlines	Zaventem	2001	Charter airline	P	A
Tibotec	Health care	Pharmaceuticals	Mechelen	1994	Pharma, subsidiary of Johnson & Johnson (US)	P	A
TiGenix	Health care	Biotechnology	Leuven	2000	Biomedical	P	A
Truvo	Industrials	Business support services	Antwerp	1968	Local search, directories	P	A
TUIfly Belgium	Consumer services	Airlines	Zaventem	2003	Airline	P	A
UCB	Health care	Pharmaceuticals	Brussels	1928	Pharma	P	A
Umicore	Basic materials	General mining	Brussels	1989	Materials and mining	P	A
Unibind	Industrials	Containers and packaging	Brussels	1939	Bookbinding	P	A
Union Minière du Haut Katanga	Basic materials	General mining	Brussels	1906	Mining, defunct 1966	P	D
Van Genechten Packaging	Industrials	Containers and packaging	Turnhout	1833	Printing, packaging	P	A
Van Hool	Industrials	Commercial vehicles and trucks	Koningshooikt	1947	Buses	P	A
Vanbreda International	Financials	Life insurance	Antwerp	1937	Health insurance	P	A
Vanparys	Consumer goods	Food products	Brussels	1889	Confectioner	P	A
Velleman	Industrials	Electronic equipment	Gavere	1975	Electronics	P	A
Vinçotte	Industrials	Business support services	Brussels	1873	Inspections	P	A
VLM Airlines	Consumer services	Airlines	Antwerp	1992	Airline	P	A
VPK Group	Packaging	-	Oudegem	1936	-	P	A
Walloon SME finance and guarantee company	Financials	Specialty finance	Liège	2002	Financing	P	A
Zetes	Technology	Technology hardware	Brussels	1984	Identification technology	P	A

== See also ==
- List of largest companies in Belgium
- List of Belgium-related topics
- List of airlines of Belgium
- List of Belgian banks
