= Belgian Foreign Trade Agency =

- Founded: 2002
- Website: https://www.abh-ace.be/en

The Belgian Foreign Trade Agency (BFTA) is a Belgian public institution, founded in 2002 to promote Belgian foreign trade. It organises two economic missions a year in cooperation with regional trade agencies and disseminates information and studies on foreign markets. The agency was founded under a Cooperation Agreement between the Federal Authority and the Regions.

== History ==
The Belgian Foreign Trade Agency was founded under the Cooperation Agreement of 24 May 2002 (only available in French and Dutch) agreed between the Federal Authority and the Regions. In recent decades, the competence for ‘foreign trade’ has undergone some phases of regionalisation in Belgium. Until 1990, the Belgian Foreign Trade Office (Belgische Dienst voor Buitenlandse Handel - Office belge du Commerce extérieur) was the most important institution for export promotion. In 1990, a Walloon agency Wallonia Foreign Trade and Investment Agency, was founded, followed by a Flemish equivalent in 1991 Flanders Investment & Trade. That same year, Brussels Invest & Export - now hub.brussels - was also founded.

The Agency has as Honorary Chairman His Majesty the King and as Chairman Didier Malherbe. Mrs Sarah Albaladejo Garcia is Vice-chair of the Board of Directors of the Agency.

== Financing ==
The Agency is financed by an indexed federal allocation and by contributions from the Regions on the basis of the distribution scale regarding taxes on natural persons.

== Activities ==
The Belgian Foreign Trade Agency endeavours to provide support to the three Regions and the federal government in promoting foreign trade.

In accordance with Article 3 of the Cooperation Agreement dated 24 May 2002 between the Federal Government and the Regions, the Agency is responsible for:

- deciding on and organising joint trade missions linked to an initiative by one or several of the Regions or at the request of the Federal Government,
- organising, developing and disseminating information, studies and documentation on foreign markets for the Regional Services responsible for foreign trade in accordance with Appendix 1,
- carrying out tasks of common interest as unanimously decided by the Board of Directors. In December 2014, the Board decided that, from 2015 onwards, the Belgian Foreign Trade Agency would contribute to the logistical organisation and the economic component of two State Visits abroad by the Belgian Sovereigns each year.

== 1. Organisation of Belgian economic missions ==
The Agency organises two economic missions a year in cooperation with the Wallonia Export-Investment Agency (AWEX), hub.brussels and Flanders Investment & Trade. In addition, the BFTA collaborates with the FPS Foreign Affairs, which is responsible for the protocol and political aspects of the programme. Companies from various industries take part in these missions, which chiefly focus on economic growth regions and countries. Belgian business representatives can establish high-level contacts with leading local industrial players, organisations and public bodies during these missions.

== 2. Information dissemination (on foreign markets) ==
The Agency develops and disseminates information, studies and documentation on foreign markets for the benefit of the regional services responsible for foreign trade. The agency also provides advice about international trade regulations and legislation.
