= TVH =

TVH is a short form of several things:

- Thermote & Vanhalst, an industrial and agricultural equipment company
- Star Trek IV: The Voyage Home, a 1986 film in the Star Trek franchise
- T-V-H (cable system), a submarine telecommunications cable system linking Thailand, Vietnam, and Hong Kong
- Total vaginal hysterectomy, a surgical removal of the womb through the vagina
- Thames Valley Harriers, an athletic club based at Linford Christie Stadium, West London
- Television Hokkaido (TVh), a television station in Hokkaido, Japan
- WTVH, a television station in Syracuse, New York.
- KTVH-DT, an NBC-affiliated station in Helena, Montana.
