= ADB Safegate =

Utility manufacturing company

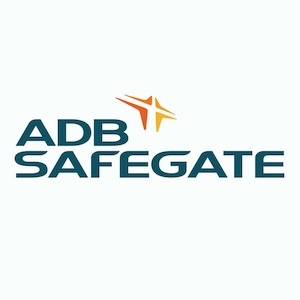

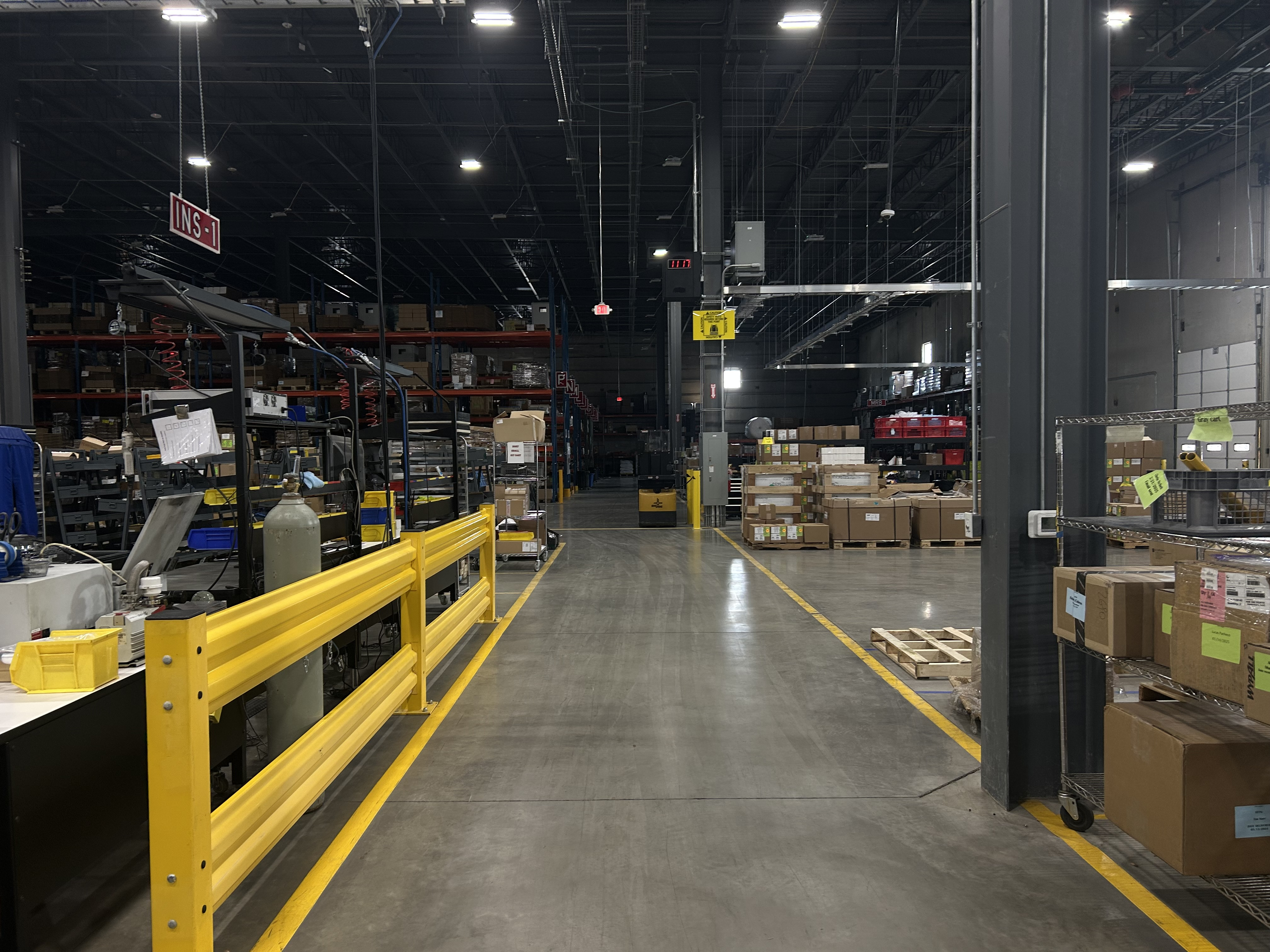
- An ADB Safegate factory in Gahanna, Ohio
- Type: Public
- Industry: Electronics design; Lighting
- Founded: 1920s
- Headquarters: Machelen, Belgium
- Area served: Worldwide
- Products: Runway lights
- Services: Airports; Aerospace

ADB Safegate is a utility manufacturing company headquartered in Machelen, Belgium. The company specializes in designing runway end identifier lights and other machinery used at airports.

== History ==
ADB Safegate was founded in the 1920s. In 2025, the company worked with Qinshift to design AIRSIDE 4.0, a technology that connects airside operations to the digital cloud. The company has also designed robotic aircraft marshalling machines that use AI and LIDAR to operate. The company also designed the Integrated Controlling Working Position (ICWP) system in 2025; it is currently used by Hamburg Airport. The company is currently operating a large factory, or "Innovation Center" in Gahanna, Ohio, located near the John Glenn Columbus International Airport.

== See also ==
- List of companies of Belgium
