= List of largest companies in Belgium =

This article lists the largest companies in Belgium in terms of their revenue, net profit and total assets, according to the American business magazines Fortune and Forbes.

== 2023 Fortune list ==
This list displays all 12 Belgian companies in the Fortune Europe 500, which ranks the largest companies in Europe by annual revenue. The figures below are given in millions of US dollars and are for the fiscal year 2022. Also listed are the headquarters location, net profit, number of employees worldwide and industry sector of each company.

Rank	Name	Industry	Revenue (USD millions)	Profits (USD millions)	Employees	Headquarters
1	Anheuser-Busch InBev	Beverages	57,786	5,969	166,632	Leuven
2	Umicore	Mining	26,946	599	11,565	Brussels
3	KBC Group	Banking	18,716	2,885	39,288	Brussels
4	Solvay S.A.	Chemicals	16,903	2,004	21,820	Brussels
5	Colruyt Group	Retail	11,257	209	31,535	Halle
6	Ageas	Insurance	10,920	1,063	14,673	Brussels
7	Groupe Bruxelles Lambert	Holding	9,465	(615)	60	Brussels
8	Viohalco	Mining	7,347	280	19,762	Brussels
9	Proximus	Telecommunications	6,220	473	11,634	Brussels
10	Bekaert	Chemicals	5,944	283	23,551	Zwevegem
11	UCB	Pharmaceuticals	5,803	440	8,721	Brussels
12	Belfius	Banking	5,663	1,025	6,343	Saint-Josse-ten-Noode

== 2024 Forbes list ==
This list is based on the Forbes Global 2000, which ranks the world's 2,000 largest publicly traded companies. The Forbes list takes into account a multitude of factors, including the revenue, net profit, total assets and market value of each company; each factor is given a weighted rank in terms of importance when considering the overall ranking. The table below also lists the headquarters location and industry sector of each company. The figures are in billions of US dollars and are for the year 2023. All 10 companies from Belgium are listed.

Rank	Forbes 2000 rank	Name	Headquarters	Revenue (billions US$)	Profit (billions US$)	Assets (billions US$)	Value (billions US$)	Industry
1	88	Anheuser-Busch InBev	Leuven	59.4	5.3	221.0	138.1	Beverages
2	241	KBC Bank	Brussels	29.8	3.2	388.2	30.0	Finance
3	786	Ageas	Brussels	12.2	1.0	106.1	9.4	Insurance
4	1337	Solvay S.A.	Brussels	9.9	2.1	7.5	3.9	Chemicals
5	1469	Colruyt Group	Halle	10.8	1.1	7.1	5.6	Retail
6	1626	D'Ieteren	Brussels	8.6	0.5	8.0	11.4	Automotive
7	1636	UCB	Brussels	5.7	0.4	17.2	25.7	Pharmaceuticals
8	1713	Umicore	Brussels	19.7	0.4	11.2	5.1	Mining
9	1974	Euronav	Brussels	1.1	1.2	3.7	4.0	Oil and Gas

== See also ==
- Economy of Belgium
- List of companies of Belgium
- List of largest companies by revenue
