= Federal Public Service Foreign Affairs =

Belgian government system

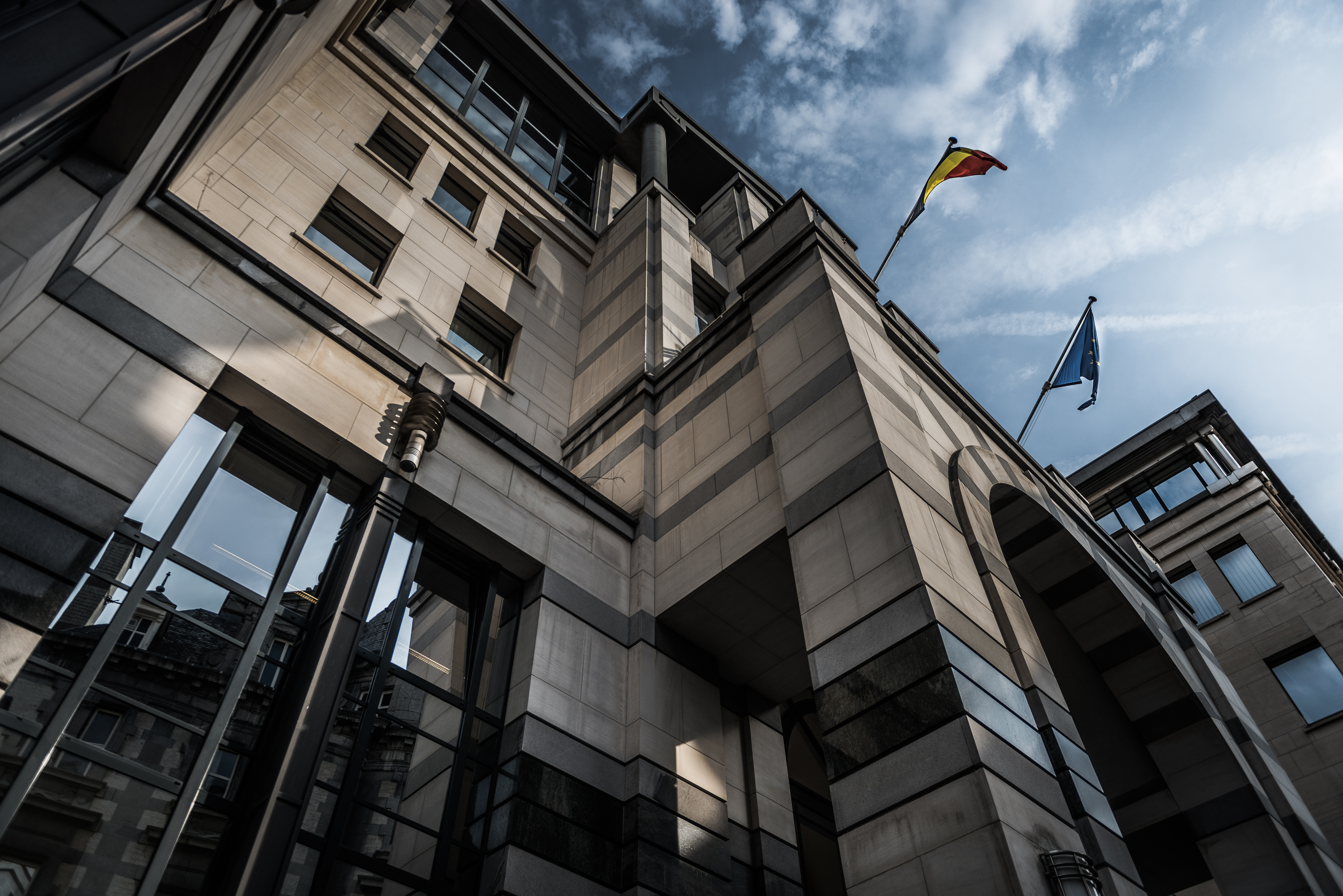

Agency overview
- Formed: 1831; 195 years ago
- Jurisdiction: Belgium
- Headquarters: Rue des Petits carmes, 24 Brussels
- Employees: 2538
- Ministers responsible: Maxime Prévot, Deputy Prime Minister and Minister of Foreign Affairs, European Affairs and Development Cooperation; Theo Francken, Minister of Defence, in charge of Foreign Trade
- Website: https://diplomatie.belgium.be/en

The Federal Public Service Foreign Affairs or Foreign Trade and Development Cooperation (FPS Foreign Affairs) is the foreign affairs ministry of Belgium and is responsible for Belgian foreign policy, relations with the European Union, development cooperation policy and certain aspects of foreign trade policy. The central government in Brussels directs the network of diplomatic and consular representations abroad.

== Mission, core tasks and vision ==
The following are the mission, core tasks and vision of the FPS Foreign Affairs.

=== Mission ===
The FPS Foreign Affairs, Foreign Trade and Development Cooperation represents, defends and promotes the interests of Belgium and Belgians abroad, promotes the coherence of foreign action and coordinates Belgium's European policy as a federal country. The FPS Foreign Affairs strives for a safe, just and prosperous world.

=== Core tasks ===
The most important tasks of the FPS Foreign Affairs can be summarised as follows:

- the defence of Belgium's political, economic and legal interests;
- the protection of and assistance to Belgians abroad as well as assistance to the diplomatic/international corps based in Belgium;
- the preparation, coordination and monitoring of the Belgian European policy in all its facets;
- the defence of fundamental values such as democracy, human dignity, human rights, rule of law and gender equality;
- contributing to a peaceful and secure world by strengthening the multilateral system (the United Nations and similar) and the international legal order;
- contributing to an international society based on solidarity and to poverty reduction, including through targeted and sustainable development cooperation.

=== Vision ===
As a government organisation, the FPS Foreign Affairs aims to provide added value for Belgian and international society. It is:

- a customer-focused organisation that has regard to the needs of its users, both internally and externally;
- a modern, high-performance and efficient organisation that succeeds in achieving the objectives set quickly and efficiently;
- an attractive, dynamic and innovative employer, where employees are motivated to give the best of themselves on a daily basis because they have the necessary participation and responsibility, are supported in their development, can work in a pleasant and safe environment, and have opportunities to better reconcile their work and family life.

The FPS' concrete contribution to its mission is evident from a number of initiatives:

- Belgian diplomacy has often played a pioneering role in international disarmament agreements, such as the Ottawa Treaty of 1997 and the Oslo Convention of 2008.
- In 2010, Belgium held the presidency of the Council of the EU and the FPS Foreign Affairs was responsible for coordination. Our country made remarkable breakthroughs in specific areas, such as the European patent and the free trade agreement with South Korea. The next Belgian Presidency will take place during the first half of 2024.
- Led by Minister for Development Cooperation Alexander De Croo, Belgium was one of the founding persons of the She Decides campaign, which stands up for women's rights, in particular sexual and reproductive rights. The Belgian, Dutch, Swedish and Danish governments organised a donor conference for the campaign in Brussels in March 2017. Since then, She Decides has grown into a global movement.
- From 2019 to the end of 2020, Belgium was a non-permanent member of the UN Security Council. During the vote on the seat, Belgium received support from 181 countries, well over the necessary two-thirds majority. Belgium focuses on the themes of protection, prevention and efficiency.
- In November 2019, Belgium organised the largest Belgian trade mission to China ever. The mission was led by HRH Princess Astrid and came about through cooperation between the Foreign Trade Agency, the three regional institutions for foreign trade (Flanders Investment & Trade – FIT, hub.brussels and the Wallonia Export-Investment Agency – AWEX) and the FPS Foreign Affairs. 632 business people, academics and politicians took part in the trade mission.

== History ==
The foreign affairs ministry of Belgium was established during the first Regency Government, on 26 February 1831. It functioned in the newly independent state alongside four other ministries, namely War Affairs, Finance, Home Affairs and Justice. Along with the expansion of the central government, the first diplomatic missions were also opened, first in London and Paris.

Between 1830 and 1880, the young and neutral Belgium tried to position itself internationally. From the outset, the ministry's powers were focused on areas that still occupy an important place today: “political affairs”, “foreign trade” and “consulates”. The consulates contributed to the economic and commercial expansion of Belgium and looked for new markets. After 1880, the Belgian consulates became the figurehead of the extraordinary economic and commercial activity in Belgium as a result of the Industrial Revolution. The ministry managed major investments, conducted trade negotiations and signed the first trade agreements.

During the two World Wars, the ministry moved abroad. During 1914–1918, it was located in Le Havre. During 1940–1945, it moved to London. In the decades that followed, the ministry's tasks underwent a major transformation. Europe, multilateralism (international cooperation) and development cooperation developed into specific policy areas, which was also reflected in the ministry's organisational chart.

In 1997, the department moved from the Rue Quatre Bras in Brussels to the Rue des Petits Carmes. This was accompanied by a new reorganisation, in which multilateral and thematic sectors (human rights, scientific issues, arms control, environmental issues) were becoming increasingly prominent.

In 2000, the Copernicus Reform led to a change in terminology: the "ministry" became a "federal public service", headed by a chairman of the executive committee" and no longer a secretary-general. The FPS has also adapted to the development of the federal state in Belgium and plays a coordinating role in the creation and representation of Belgian positions on European or multilateral affairs through consultation with other federal institutions and the regions and communities in Belgium.

Due to the development of Brussels as the international capital with the highest number of diplomatic representations in the world, the FPS Foreign Affairs is, via its protocol service, an important point of contact for the many foreign missions in Belgium.

== Organisation ==
=== Ministers with jurisdiction ===
- Minister for Foreign Affairs, European Affairs and Foreign Trade: Sophie Wilmès (since 1 October 2020)
- Minister for Development Cooperation: Meryame Kitir (since 1 October 2020)

=== Central Government ===
The central government is structured as follows:

- the Directorate General for Bilateral Affairs (DGB)
- the Directorate General for Consular Affairs (DGC)
- the Directorate General for Development Cooperation and Humanitarian Aid (DGD)
- the Directorate General for European Affairs and Coordination (DGE)
- the Directorate General for Legal Affairs (DGJ)
- the Directorate General for Multilateral Affairs and Globalisation (DGM)
- the Staff Directorate for Personnel and Organisational
- the Staff Directorate for Budget and Management Control
- the Staff Directorate for ICT
- the Protocol Directorate
- the Strategy & Communication Directorate

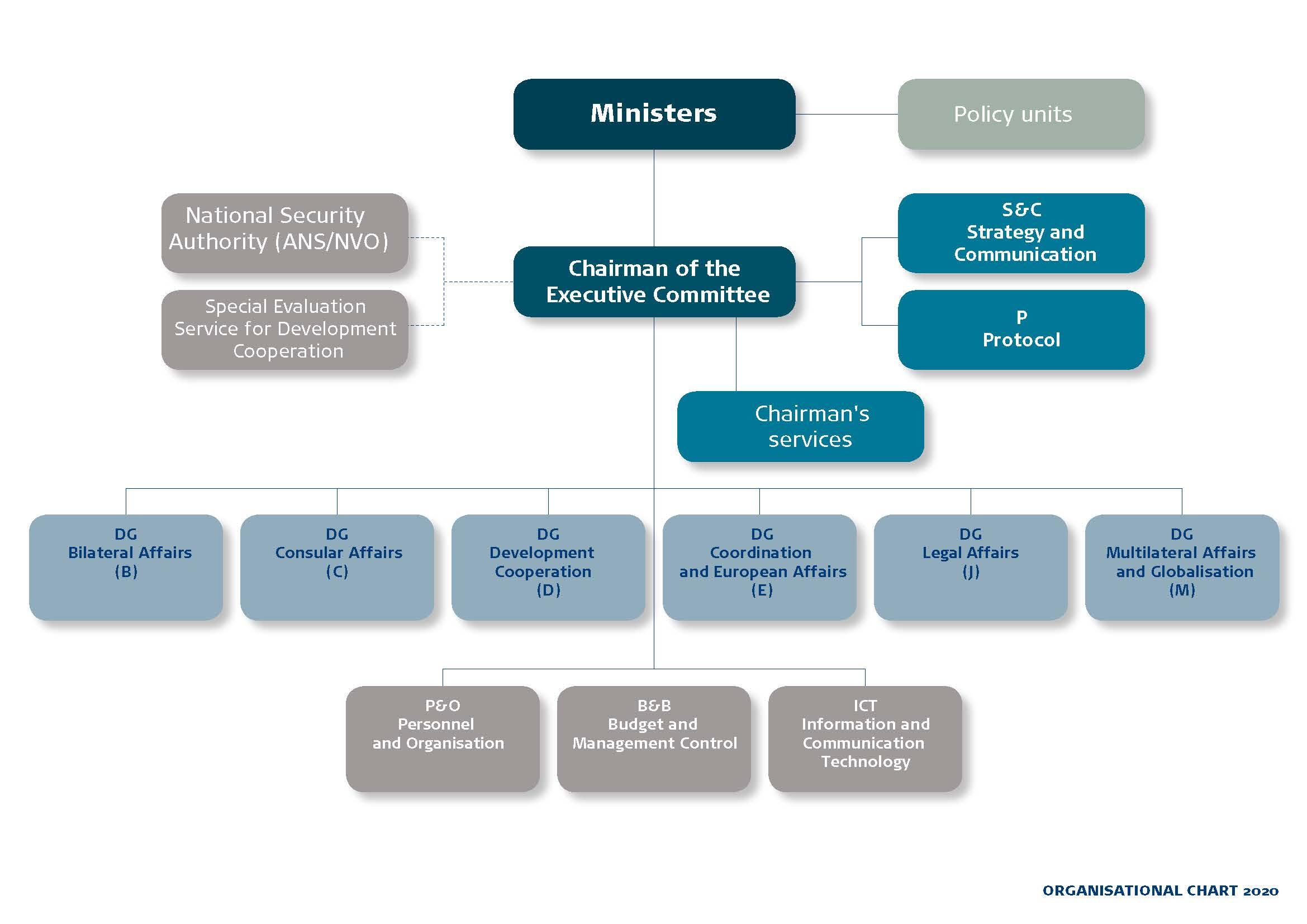
The organisation chart of the Federal Public Service Foreign Affairs

==== Directorate General for Bilateral Affairs (DGB) ====
The Directorate General for Bilateral Affairs (DGB) defends Belgian interests in and in respect of other countries. It promotes bilaterally – from country to country – the ethical principles and social values of Belgium: democracy, welfare, human rights and respect for the dignity of the individual. It also has particular regard for supporting Belgian economic interests.

==== Directorate General for Consular Affairs (DGC) ====
The Directorate General for Consular Affairs (DGC) supports and supervises the work of Belgian consular departments abroad. These sections:

- act as a town hall for Belgians living abroad with regard to matters of nationality, civil status, notarial deeds, legalisations, passports, identity cards and elections, among other things.
- assist compatriots in transit or in difficulty abroad: tourists, Belgians arrested abroad, child abductions, etc.
- issue a visa to foreigners who wish to reside or settle in Belgium.

The Directorate General for Consular Affairs also informs and assists individuals in Belgium on consular matters and is in permanent contact with the Belgian authorities responsible for these areas (Justice, Home Affairs, municipalities, regions and communities).

==== Directorate General for Development Cooperation and Humanitarian Aid (DGD) ====
The Directorate General for Development Cooperation and Humanitarian Aid (DGD) is responsible for Belgian Development Cooperation and comes under the authority of the Minister for Development Cooperation.

The Belgian Development Cooperation strives for sustainable human development. It also aims to stimulate and strengthen the involvement of Belgian public opinion in North-South solidarity and development policy.

DGD develops a common vision on development cooperation through a dialogue with all government institutions that have an impact on development policy, with the development actors involved in the Belgian Development Cooperation (NGOs, scientific institutions, etc.) and with the European and international institutions. DGD translates this vision into a number of priorities for the central government and the field. The Sustainable Development Goals (SDGs) play a central role in this. DGD manages the development funds allocated of Enabel, the Belgian development agency, as well as NGOs.

==== Directorate General for European Affairs and Coordination (DGE) ====
The Directorate General for European Affairs and Coordination is responsible for preparing, defining, representing, managing and monitoring Belgian policy on Europe. With the increasing integration of Europe and the increased role of the EU internationally, DGE's mission is growing in importance.

The DGE is at the heart of the Belgian decision-making process, in consultation with the federal institutions and the regional and community authorities, so that Belgium can speak with one voice on the European stage.

==== Directorate General for Legal Affairs (DGJ) ====
The Directorate General for Legal Affairs (DGJ) has a general advisory role for all areas of law related to the activities of the FPS: public international law, European law, consular law, administrative law, employment contract law, etc. It is also responsible for the management of the FPS' activities.

The DGJ also defends Belgium in international courts, the jurisdictions of the European Union and the European Economic Area, as well as the Belgian courts, in disputes to which the FPS Foreign Affairs is a party.

Finally, the DGJ plays a key role in relation to treaties, which are by definition international, both during the negotiation and signature process and during the approval procedure by the various Parliaments.

==== Directorate General for Multilateral Affairs and Globalisation ====
The Directorate General for Multilateral Affairs and Globalisation (DGM) is responsible for promoting and defending Belgium's foreign policy on multilateral issues and the European Union's Common Foreign and Security Policy (CFSP). It is responsible for issues such as human rights, disarmament and non-proliferation, and environment and climate, among other things.

The DGM is also responsible for maintaining the coherence of Belgium's multilateral policy through consultation with other federal bodies, the regions and communities and civil society organisations.

=== Network of posts ===
The central government is supported by a worldwide, distributed diplomatic network of 118 posts. In 2020, Belgium has:

- 84 embassies
- 17 consultates-general
- 3 consulates
- 3 diplomatic offices
- 1 Belgian office (in Taipei)

8 permanent representations to international organisations

Moreover, Belgium has more than 300 honorary consulates, spread all over the world.

=== Staffing ===
In June 2020, the FPS Foreign Affairs, Foreign Trade and Development Cooperation employed 2,909 people. Of these, about 40% are staff at the central government and 60% are staff at the posts (expatriate agents on foreign career paths, expatriate contractors and locally recruited contractors). 50 FPS staff members are in the ‘special situation’ category, due to secondment to an international institution or leave on assignment.

== Current foreign policy orientations ==
=== Foreign Affairs, European Affairs and Foreign Trade ===
- Contributing to a strong European Union is the best guarantee for the prosperity and security of Belgium;
- Making the best use of our diplomacy to defend Belgium's economic interests;
- Working for peace and security at all levels – from country to country and through international institutions – along with Defence, Development Cooperation and Justice. Particular attention is paid to conflict prevention, management and mediation, disarmament, the fight against terrorism and violent extremism, and the fight against fraud and human trafficking;
- Defending our values and principles of international solidarity: human rights and the rule of law (children, gender equality, the fight against all forms of discrimination, abolition of the death penalty, etc.), solidarity with Central Africa, the UN's Sustainable Development Goals (SDGs) (health, climate, biodiversity, etc.) and the European Green Deal, etc.
- Modernising services for Belgian citizens abroad: digitalisation (e-Consul, electronic voting, etc.), crisis centre, Travellers Online, etc.
- Optimising the department in terms of operation, sustainability, communication, foreign careers, etc.

=== Development Cooperation ===
- Making the eradication of extreme poverty central (through the formalisation of employment, basic health care, food security, social protection, clean water and sanitation, etc.)
- Fighting inequality (gender equality, inclusive growth, tax collection, etc.)
- Combatting climate change and environmental degradation (climate financing, etc.)
- Addressing root causes of fragility (human rights, anti-corruption, rule of law, etc.)
- Encouraging a private sector that creates decent work (including through the Belgian Investment Company for Developing Countries (BIO), the Business Partnership Facility and sustainable supply chains);
- Creating support among Belgians (world citizenship, etc.);
- Streamlining human mobility and providing protection (high-quality reception and protection of refugees in conflict zones, etc.).

You can also have a look at the policy declaration and policy note of Minister Wilmès and at the policy declaration and policy note of Minister Kitir (only in Dutch and French).

== Services for citizens and foreign diplomats ==
Consular services are an essential part of the FPS' activities. Central management and the network of posts come first when Belgians are involved in a crisis or accident abroad. To this end, the FPS provides Belgian citizens with travel advice to prepare and organise their trip. The online tool Travellers Online allows Belgians to register in order to be more easily accessible in the event of local problems. This enables the FPS to provide information and assistance to travellers.

Furthermore, the consular services in Brussels and the consular posts abroad act as a public service and are responsible, for example, for issuing Belgian identity cards or passports, processing visa applications or legalising official documents.

Another type of service is provided by the National Security Authority (ANS/NVO). The ANS/NVO is responsible for issuing and revoking security clearances, security certificates and security advice, as well as managing and supervising the proper security of classified information in Belgium.

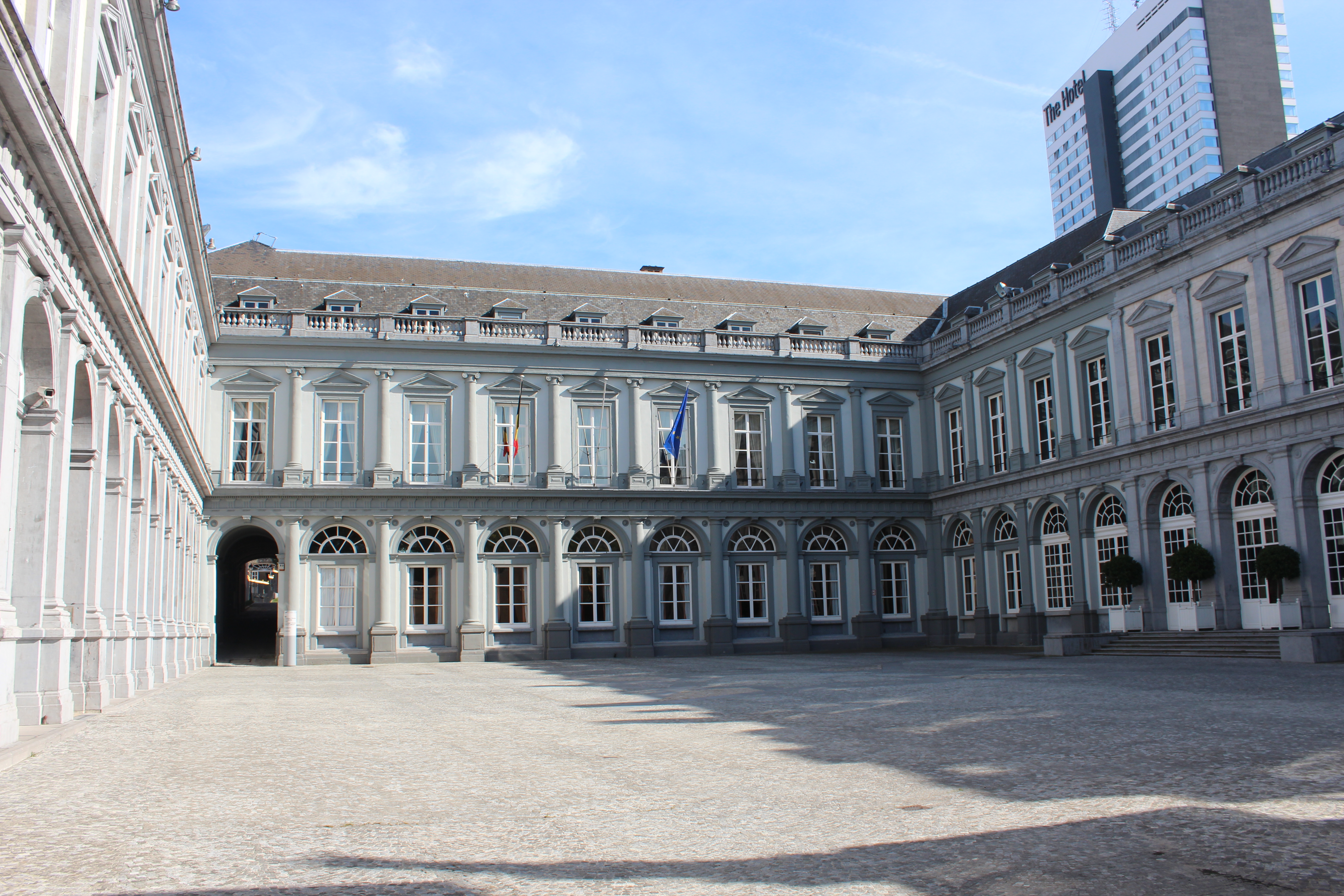
The Egmont Palace in Brussels

Finally, the Protocol Directorate provides services for maintaining official relations between the Belgian State and the foreign diplomatic representations established in Belgium. It monitors the application of the Vienna Conventions on diplomatic and consular exchanges, as well as the ‘headquarters agreements’ between Belgium and the international organisations that are established or represented in this country. This concerns aspects related to diplomatic privileges and immunities, as well as matters of strict protocol. The Protocol Directorate is also responsible for the reception of prominent foreign dignitaries, the organisation of events at the Egmont Palace and the granting of noble favours and honours in the national orders.

== Behind the scenes at Foreign Affairs ==
In 2019, the Flemish channel VIER broadcast the human interest series ‘De Ambassade’ (The Embassy). The eight-part series illustrated some of the activities of the FPS Foreign Affairs and its network of posts. The Belgian embassies in Bangkok (Thailand) and Nairobi (Kenya) and the consulates-general in New York (United States) and Rio de Janeiro (Brazil) were among the subjects discussed.

In 2020, the Flemish television channel Canvas broadcast the documentary series ‘Corps Diplomatique’ (Diplomatic Corps), made by journalist and documentary maker Bart Aerts. In 5 episodes, produced in collaboration with the FPS Foreign Affairs, the series offered a look behind the scenes of Belgian diplomacy in a number of key positions, including New York (United Nations), Brussels (European Union), Bamako (Mali) and Beijing (China).

Furthermore, several books have been published that offer a glimpse behind the scenes of Belgian diplomacy. A selection:

- Raoul Delcorde, Les diplomates belges, 2010, ISBN 9782804700430
- Rik Coolsaet, Buitenlandse Zaken in België. Geschiedenis van een ministerie, zijn diplomaten en zijn consuls van 1830 tot vandaag, 2014, ISBN 9789401422413
- Bart Aerts, Corps Diplomatique. Achter de schermen van de Belgische diplomatie, 2020, ISBN 9789463105125
- Peter Van Kemseke, België aan het hoofd van Europa (1948–2010), 2010, ISBN 9789044126235
- Peter Van Kemseke, België in de Veiligheidsraad 1946–2006, 2007, ISBN 9789033464317

== See also ==
- List of Belgian Ministers for Foreign Affairs
- List of Belgian Ministers for Foreign Trade
- List of Belgian Ministers for Development Cooperation
