= Walloon SME finance and guarantee company =

The Walloon SME finance and guarantee company (French: Société Wallonne de Financement et de Garantie des Petites et Moyennes Entreprises or SOWALFIN) was founded in Liège by the Walloon Region in 2002 to provide capital to the Walloon Small and medium enterprises (SMEs). The purpose of SOWALFIN is to invest in the equity of unlisted companies (private equity). The SRIW acts either by purchasing shares of SMEs, by increasing the capital of the business, by subscribing to a bond issue, or by granting subordinated or convertible loans.

== See also ==
- Economy of Belgium
- Walloon Export and Foreign Investment Agency (AWEX)
- Regional Investment Company of Wallonia
- Brussels Regional Investment Company
- Sillon industriel
