= Gary Lubner =

South African businessman and philanthropist

- Born: 1959 (age 66–67); South Africa
- Citizenship: British
- Occupations: Businessman, entrepreneur
- Known for: Former CEO of Belron, Labour Party donor

Gary Lubner (born 1959) is a British businessman and philanthropist, born in South Africa. He is the founder of the charitable foundation This Day and served as CEO of Belron, the parent company of Autoglass, from 2000 to 2023. He has been a major donor to the UK Labour Party.

== Early life and education ==
Lubner grew up in Johannesburg, South Africa, in a liberal Jewish family who fled Eastern Europe due to persecution. His grandfather initially earned a living selling glass from a wooden cart after arriving in South Africa.

== Anti-South African apartheid activities ==
Prior to studying at the University of Cape Town, Lubner was conscripted into the South African police force, an experience he later described as instrumental in shaping his opposition to apartheid. He actively supported the anti-apartheid movement and defended Nelson Mandela, telling the Financial Times about "getting into many fights with business people who were saying 'he's a terrorist' and all of that.

== Business career ==
Lubner moved to London in the late 1980s to study for an MBA at London Business School and upon graduating began working for Belron/Autoglass. In 2000, he became CEO of Belron, where he led the company through expansion to 37 countries. Under his leadership, revenue grew from €822m in 2000 to ~€6bn by 2023 operating under various brand names including Autoglass in the UK. In 2021, he implemented one of the largest employee share distributions in corporate history, allocating €300 million to 30,000 employees. He stepped down as CEO in 2023.

== Political involvement ==
Lubner became "disenchanted" with the UK's Conservative government and in 2021, following a meeting with Labour Shadow Chancellor Rachel Reeves, he decided to support the Labour Party.

By 2024, he had become one of Labour's largest individual donors, contributing £4.5 million to the party.

== Philanthropy ==
Through his foundation This Day, Lubner supports initiatives focused on education and equality. He has expressed a desire to give away "the vast majority" of his wealth to charitable and progressive causes.

Lubner has made contributions to charities working to alleviate the humanitarian crisis in Gaza, as well as victims and families of the October 7 attacks. His philanthropic work also includes support for the United Jewish Israel Appeal, which focuses on educational and community development programs.

== Brentford Football Club ==
In July 2025, Lubner became a minority shareholder in Brentford Football Club, alongside English filmmaker Sir Matthew Vaughn. This investment was made by Lubner in collaboration with Vaughn's film company, MARV, into Best Intentions Analytics, the holding company for Brentford F.C. and Spanish club Mérida AD. A motivation for Lubner's investment in Brentford F.C. was the work of the Brentford FC Community Sports Trust. The club said the investment would support squad development and commercial growth and expand Brentford's impact locally and beyond.

== Media responses ==
In September 2024, Novara Media issued an apology to Lubner and his family following the publication of allegations in a video released earlier that year. The outlet stated that Lubner did not have ties to the Israeli government and referenced his past involvement in anti-apartheid activism.

In July 2025, The Canary issued an apology regarding allegations published about Lubner's political positions. The outlet acknowledged that the claims were inaccurate.
