= Safelite =

Glass repair company

Safelite Group
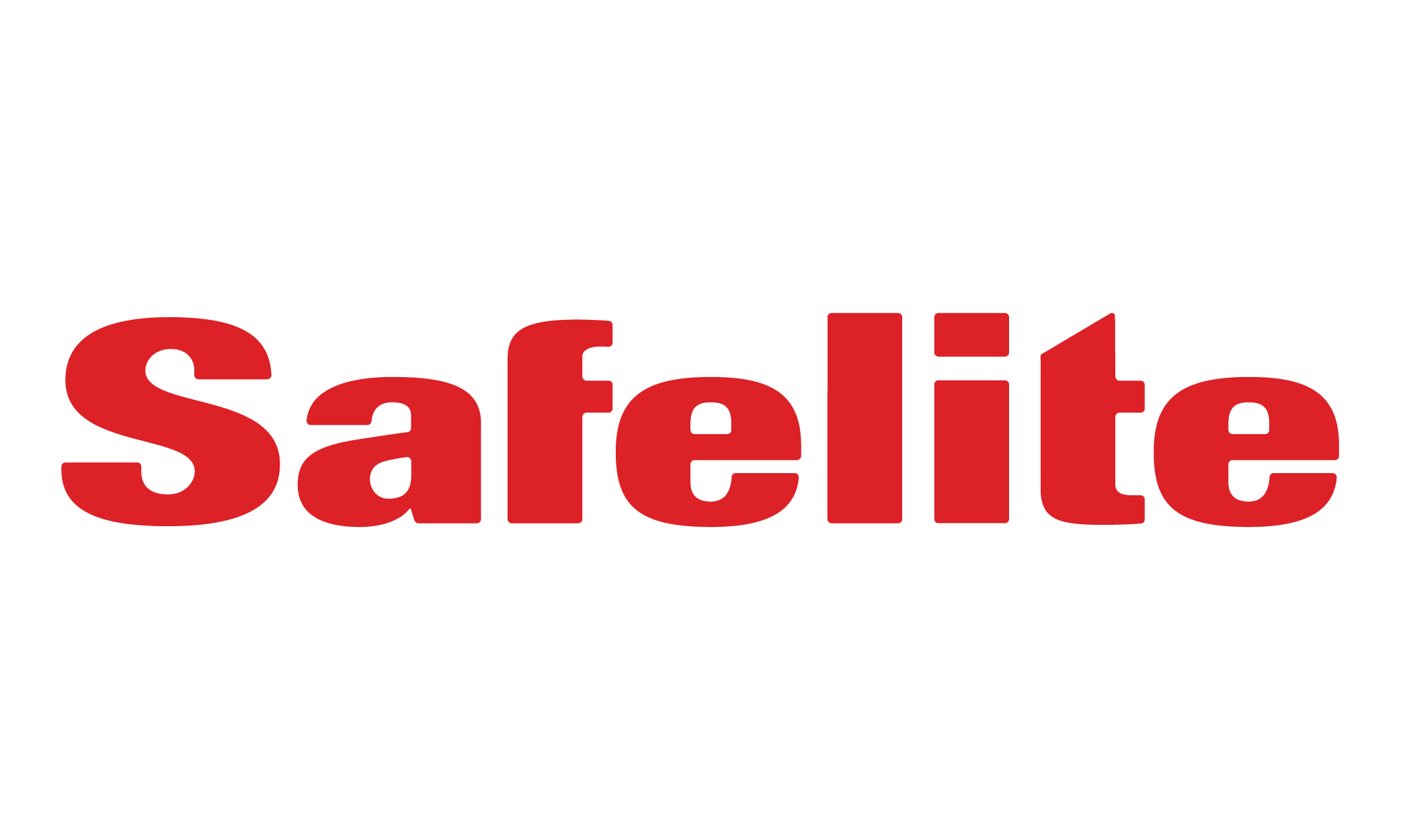
- Type: Subsidiary
- Industry: Automotive, Insurance
- Founded: 1947 (79 years ago) in Wichita, Kansas, United States
- Founders: Bud Glassman; Art Lankin
- Headquarters: Columbus, Ohio, United States
- Number of locations: 832
- Area served: North America
- Key people: Renee Cacchillo (President & CEO)
- Number of employees: ~16,000
- Parent: Belgium D'Ieteren
- Website: www.safelite.com

Safelite Group, Inc. is an American vehicle glass repair, replacement and recalibration company and a subsidiary of Belron. The company employs approximately 16,000 associates and operates in all 50 states of the United States under the Safelite brand.

== Company history ==
Safelite was founded in 1947 by Bud Glassman and Art Lankin in a small junkyard in Wichita, Kansas. Over the decades, the company expanded its presence and capabilities in vehicle glass repair and replacement services.

In 1968, Safelite was acquired by Royal Industries, which in turn was taken over by manufacturing conglomerate Lear Siegler in 1976.

Safelite acquired AFG Auto Glass, the fourth-largest auto glass installation company in the US, in 1988. The company relocated its headquarters to Columbus, Ohio in 1990 and established the Safelite Group, which consisted of three separate divisions: Safelite Solutions, Safelite AutoGlass and Service AutoGlass.

In 2007, Safelite was acquired by UK-based Belron, the world’s largest vehicle glass company. Belron operates in 42 countries and is owned by the D'Ieteren group.

In late 2021, Renee Cachillo became the president and CEO, succeeding Thomas Feeney, who had led the business since 2008.

== Philanthropy ==
In 2024, the company relaunched the Safelite Foundation, originally established in 2005, to support nonprofit organizations that align with its mission of providing safety, stability and a sense of belonging to enrich the lives of families and underserved children, with a national focus on foster care.

== See also ==
- Economy of Ohio
- Lists of companies
