= Reynaers Aluminium =

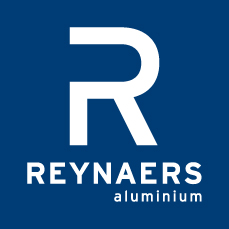
- Industry: Building industry
- Founded: Duffel, Belgium 1965
- Founder: Jan Reynaers
- Headquarters: Duffel, Belgium
- Number of locations: 37 countries
- Area served: Worldwide
- Key people: Bert Geerinckx (CEO), Eric van Zele (Chairman board of directors)
- Number of employees: 1,500 +

Reynaers Aluminium is a European developer of aluminium products for the building sector. The company offers support to architects, fabricators, solar installers, project developers, investors, and end users. Headquartered in Duffel, Belgium, the company employed over 1,500 workers across 37 countries worldwide as of 2014. Furthermore, it exports its products to 72 countries spanning 5 continents. In 2013, Reynaers recorded a turnover of 317 million euros.

== See also ==
- List of companies of Belgium
