= Belron =

Glass repair company

Belron International Limited
- Type: Subsidiary
- Industry: Automotive
- Founded: 1897; 129 years ago as Jacobs & Dandor in Cape Town, South Africa (1897)
- Headquarters: Egham, United Kingdom
- Area served: Worldwide
- Key people: Carlos Brito (CEO)
- Owner: D'Ieteren
- Number of employees: 30,000
- Website: belron.com

Belron is a vehicle glass repair, replacement and recalibration group operating worldwide across 42 countries through wholly-owned businesses and franchises and employing over 30,000 people. The company's customers include insurance partners, lease fleet and car rental companies, as well as direct retail motorists.

In 2025, Belron completed 17.1 million jobs and reported total sales of €6.72bn. The company is headquartered in Egham in the United Kingdom.

== Brands ==
Belron operates under different brands in different markets. These include:

- Safelite in the United States.
- Carglass in Europe, Brazil and Chile.
- Autoglass in the United Kingdom, Ireland and Poland.
- Hurtigruta Carglass in Norway.
- Lebeau and Speedy Glass in Canada.
- O’Brien in Australia
- Smith & Smith in New Zealand.

== Services ==
Belron provides vehicle glass repair, replacement and recalibration services to motorists through a network of owned operations and franchise businesses. These include repairing minor windscreen damage, full replacement of damaged vehicle glass, and the recalibration of advanced driver assistance systems cameras and sensors integrated into modern vehicle windscreens.

The company promotes a repair-first approach, which reduces costs for customers and lowers the waste and emissions generated by the manufacture and transport of new glass. Belron also offers a range of related products and services, such as windscreen treatments, wiper blades and air filters.

== History ==
Belron was first founded as a family business in 1897 as Jacobs & Dandor in Cape Town, South Africa. The company was purchased and renamed Plate Glass Bevelling and Silvering in 1899. In 1917, City Glass Bevelling & Silvering Works bought Plate Glass; the companies were merged in 1919 and went ahead to gain success in the windscreen industry by securing the business rights to the curved windscreen production technology in 1953 and introducing laminated rear windows in 1958.

The company began its international expansion in 1971, starting with the acquisition of O’Brien in Australia.

International expansion continued with the acquisition of UK companies Autoglass and Windshields, which merged as Autoglass Windshields in 1983.

In 1990, international acquisitions were grouped together under the name Belron.

In 2007, Belron acquired US market leader Safelite.

Gary Lubner was named CEO of Belron in 2000; both his father and grandfather had also led the business. Lubner was succeeded by Carlos Brito in 2023.
