= Zetes (company) =

Belgian technology company

Zetes Industries SA/NV
- Founded: 1984
- Headquarters: Brussels, Belgium
- Key people: Pierre Lambert, CEO
- Revenue: € 297,4 million (2023)
- Number of employees: +1341 (2023)
- Website: www.zetes.com

Zetes Industries S.A. / N.V. (Zetes Group) is a Belgian technology company headquartered in Brussels with operations in Europe, Africa and the Middle East, employing more than 1 300 people in 22 countries.

Zetes provides IT solutions for supply chain optimization and citizen identification solutions.

The company's highest profile projects include the Belgian ID cards, drivers licenses and passports. The company also makes the Portuguese ID card, the Ivorian passport and Gambia's biometric passport.

In 2017, Zetes became a subsidiary of Panasonic Corporation, integrating into the Panasonic Connect group which covers the supply chain, public service, infrastructure and entertainment sectors.

== Business divisions ==
=== Goods identification ===
Zetes develops and implements automatic identification and data capture systems for different steps in the supply chain: manufacturing, warehousing, transport, logistics and retail. Zetes’ implementations are based on automatic ID technologies: bar codes, RFID, printing, print & apply, voice recognition, image ID and AMR. There are specialist solutions for pharmaceuticals and tobacco companies.

=== People identification ===
Zetes delivers secure people authentication solutions to governments, administrative units and public institutions, based on technologies: biometrics, AFIS and smart cards. People authentication is used in the areas of people registration, secure document production and personalization, mass enrollment, data centralization and validation and electronic voting.

== History ==
Zetes was founded in 1984 and has grown organically and through acquisitions.

=== Timeline ===
- 1984: Established
- 1985: Starts selling Barcode equipment from Symbol Technologies and Zebra Technologies
- 1987: Deploys first major system to Colruyt, a large Belgian retailer
- 1992: First international expansion: office in France
- 1996: Second international expansion: office in Portugal
- 1998: Acquisition of Burótica in Portugal.
- 1999: Kick-off People ID business unit
- 2002: Large people ID projects in Belgium: electronic identity card and national health card
- 2005: IPO on Euronext Brussels, first international people identification project: enrolment of citizens and issuing of voting cards for DRC (UN contract).
- 2006: Acquisition of Powersys, Peak Europe, Vocognition, iDoc and metaform.
- 2007: Acquisition of Interscan and MD
- 2009: Acquisition of Bopack systems and ImageID
- 2010: Acquisition of Phidata BV and 51% of Netwave
- 2011: Acquisition of Anvos, Integra, RFidea and Proscan
- 2013: Acquisition of InCAPTIO (formerly known as GATC s.r.o.)
- 2016: Panasonic acquires 50.95% stake in Zetes Industries
- 2017: Panasonic Successfully Completes the Acquisition and De-listing of Zetes Industries SA

== Local presence ==
Zetes has offices in Austria, Belgium, Côte d'Ivoire, Czech Republic, Denmark, Gambia, Germany, Greece, France, Ireland, Israel, Italy, the Netherlands, Poland, Portugal, Senegal, South Africa, Spain, Switzerland and the United Kingdom
