= Panasonic Connect =

Japanese business

Panasonic Connect Co., Ltd.
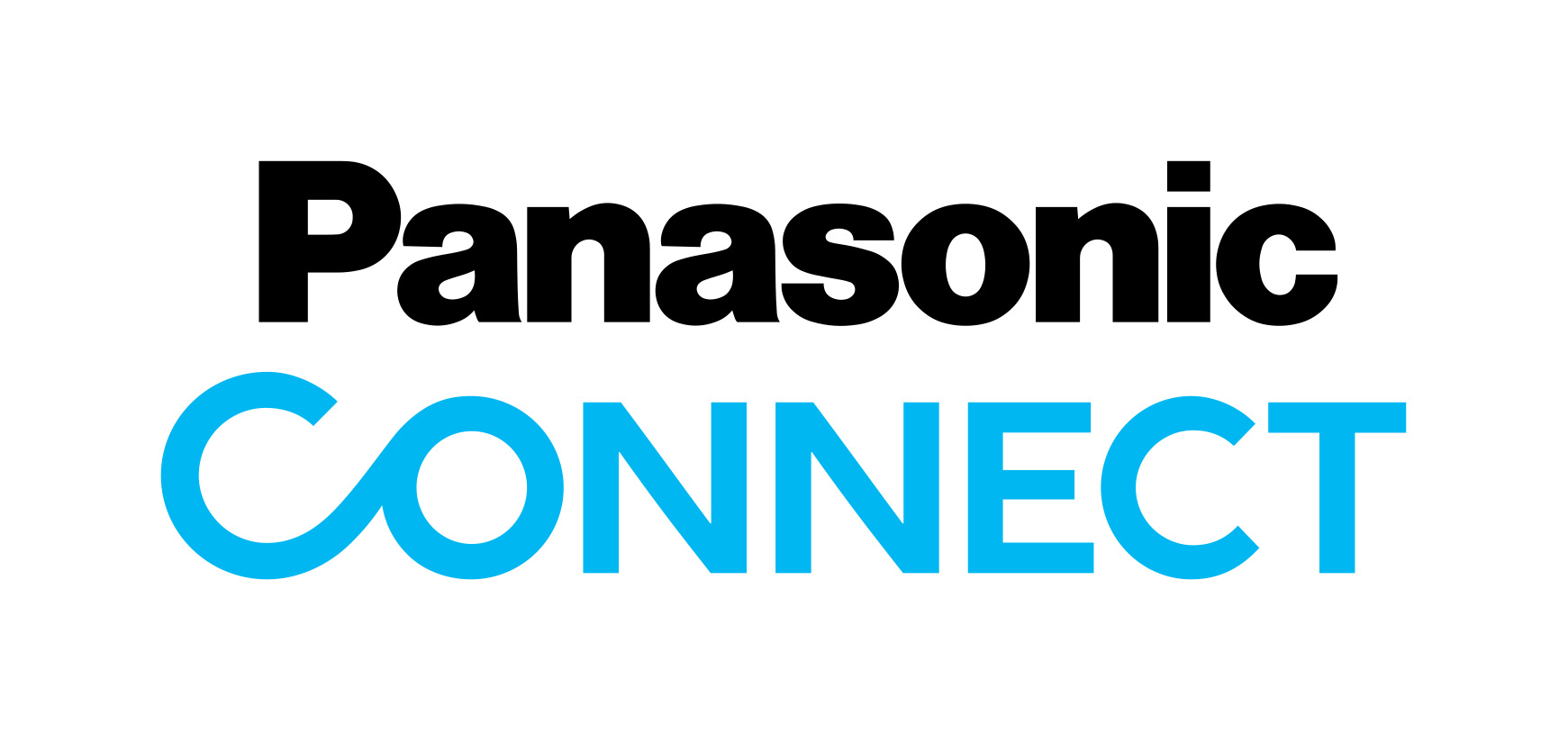
- Founded: April 1, 2022
- Headquarters: Sumitomo Fudosan Shiodome Hamarikyu Bldg., 8-21-1, Ginza, Chuo-ku, Tokyo 104-0061, Japan
- Key people: Yasu Higuchi (CEO)
- Revenue: JPY1,125.7 billion (FY2023)
- Operating income: JPY20.9 billion (FY2023)
- Number of employees: (Approx. 28,500 (as of April 1, 2022))

Panasonic Connect Co., Ltd. was established on April 1, 2022, as part of the Panasonic Group's switch to an operating company system, a move which gives authority to each company to operate independently. It was formerly called Panasonic Connected Solutions Company. Along with the company name change, it also adopted a new brand logo. Headquartered in Tokyo, Japan, the company provides products for the supply chain, public service, infrastructure, and entertainment sectors. The company has approximately 28,500 employees under its umbrella with regional sales companies in North America, Europe, Asia, and Oceania.

== Main businesses ==
Panasonic Connect consists of consolidated business divisions and independent subsidiaries including: the Gemba Solutions Company (formerly Panasonic System Solutions Japan Co., Ltd.) responsible for sales in Japan; the Process Automation Business Division which provides electronic component mounting machines and welding equipment; the Media Entertainment Business Division which provides projectors, broadcasting cameras, and sound systems; the Mobile Solutions Business Division which provides mobile devices and PCs; Panasonic Avionics Corporation which provides in-flight entertainment systems and connectivity for commercial airlines; Zetes Industries S.A. which deals in logistics traceability and people identification services; as well as the supply chain software company Blue Yonder which became a wholly owned subsidiary in September 2021. In May 2022, the company announced plans for the preparation of a stock exchange listing of its supply chain management businesses, centering on Blue Yonder.
