= Ivorian passport =

Passport issued to citizens of Ivory Coast

- Ivorian passport front cover
- Type: Passport
- Issued by: Côte d'Ivoire
- First issued: 31 July 2008 (biometric passport)
- Purpose: Identification
- Eligibility: Ivorian citizenship
- Expiration: 5 years

The Ivorian passport is issued to citizens of Ivory Coast for international travel.

== Physical properties ==
- Surname
- Given names
- Nationality Ivorian
- Date of birth
- Sex
- Place of birth
- Date of Expiry
- Passport number

== Languages ==
The data page/information page is printed in French and English.

== See also ==
- ECOWAS passports
- List of passports
- Visa requirements for Ivorian citizens
- Visa policy of Ivory Coast
