= Arvesta =

- Founded: 1891
- Key people: Niek Depoorter
- Website: arvesta.eu

Arvesta, formerly known as Aveve is a Belgian company group which is active in agriculture and horticulture.

The Aveve group is a market leader in providing goods and services, such as cattle fodder, to the agricultural sector, but also runs the largest chain of garden centres for individuals in Belgium. It is a subsidiary of the Boerenbond (Roman Catholic Farmers Organisation). The Aveve group nowadays consists of two holding companies, namely Aveve NV and Cobelal NV. Aveve groups the companies which deal with distribution, cattle fodder, agriculture and horticulture. Cobelal NV produces products for the feeding industry, and machines for agriculture and horticulture.

== History ==
The origins of Aveve date back to the foundation of the Roman Catholic Boerenbond in 1890. At the end of the nineteenth century European agriculture was in a crisis and as a response the Boerenbond was founded on 20 July 1890 by John F Mellaerts, Joris Helleputte and Frans Schollaert. It was a farmers' organization and was based on the cooperative model of Friedrich Wilhelm Raiffeisen.

At the end of the 1890s a new organisation was created to group the commercial activities of the Boerenbond. The AVV (Aan- en Verkoopvennootschap or E: Buy and Sell Society) was founded as an independent organisation on 19 January 1901 by notary Roberti de Winghe te Leuven in Leuven. De Boerenbond was the main shareholder and management was provided by members of the Farmers organization.

During 2018, Aveve changed its name to Arvesta, but the 250 retail stores owned by the company retained the Aveve name.
