= AIM Productions =

AIM Productions NV is a Belgian IT company which produces software for the consumer and industrial markets linked to both stationary and mobile platforms. It was founded in 1994, and is based in Hove, Flanders.

AIM produces software and applications for mobile telephones, including cameras, GPS, SMS-systems, ringtones, dictionaries, games, and hardware. Examples of companies that use AIM products are i-Mate, Motorola, HP, Vodafone, Orange, T-Mobile, and others.
