= Unibind =

Unibind is a subsidiary of Peleman Industries, a company that was founded in 1939 in Belgium. The Unibind brand name is associated with thermal bookbinding machines and supplies.

== Unibind machines ==
Unibind thermal binding machines utilize "SteelBinding" technology, which uses resin in a steel channel to bind a document's pages together. Unibind machines create permanent bindings for hardcover, paperback, and photo books, and bind multiple documents at one time. The largest one, the ST1025, can bind up to 50 books simultaneously.

== Unibind covers ==
Unibind manufactures covers for its machines and customized covers, allowing users to brand their printed reports with original logos.
