= Vanbreda International =

Belgian health insurance company

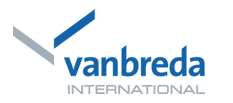
- Industry: International Health Insurance
- Founded: 1937
- Headquarters: Antwerp, Belgium
- Products: International Health plans, Group Disability, Life and Accident Insurance, and Disability
- Number of employees: 420
- Website: www.cignahealthbenefits.com

Vanbreda International was a diversified cross-border health care insurance provider, headquartered in Antwerp, Belgium.

Its core business was setting up and administering health insurance programmes and employee benefits for intergovernmental organisations, multinational corporations and their international workforce.

On Tuesday, August 31, 2010 - Vanbreda International was acquired by CIGNA. Vanbreda International officially changed its name to Cigna on 2 February 2015.

== History ==
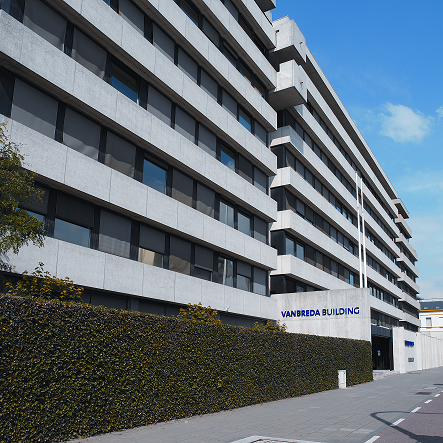
Vanbreda Building in Antwerp, company headquarters.

In 1930 Jos and Maurice Van Breda, two brothers from Lier, founded Bank J.Van Breda & Co. The Van Breda brothers (and therefore all Vanbreda companies) are of Flemish origin. The brothers did not restrict themselves just to banking activities; it quickly became apparent that brokerage was in full development and so in 1937 they opened the insurance office J.Van Breda & Co.

After the Second World War they moved the offices to the Frankrijklei in Antwerp and in 1968 new offices were built on the Plantin and Moretuslei. Vanbreda International originated as a spin-off of the insurance office, J.Van Breda & Co. Its activities were very specific and as the department was growing fast a separate company was started in 1974 - J.Van Breda & Co International was born.

On 28 April 2003 the name was changed to 'Vanbreda International' and 'Vanbreda Risk & Benefits'. These are both independent brokers which, via the Unibreda holding, were in the hands of the Leysen and Van Antwerpen families.

The two companies, Bank J.Van Breda & Co and Vanbreda Verzekeringsmakelaardij, went their own way for about ten years and their activities are now completely separate. In 2004 the Leysen and Van Antwerpen families sold their last shares in Bank J.Van Breda & Co to Ackermans & Van Haaren.
