= VPK Group =

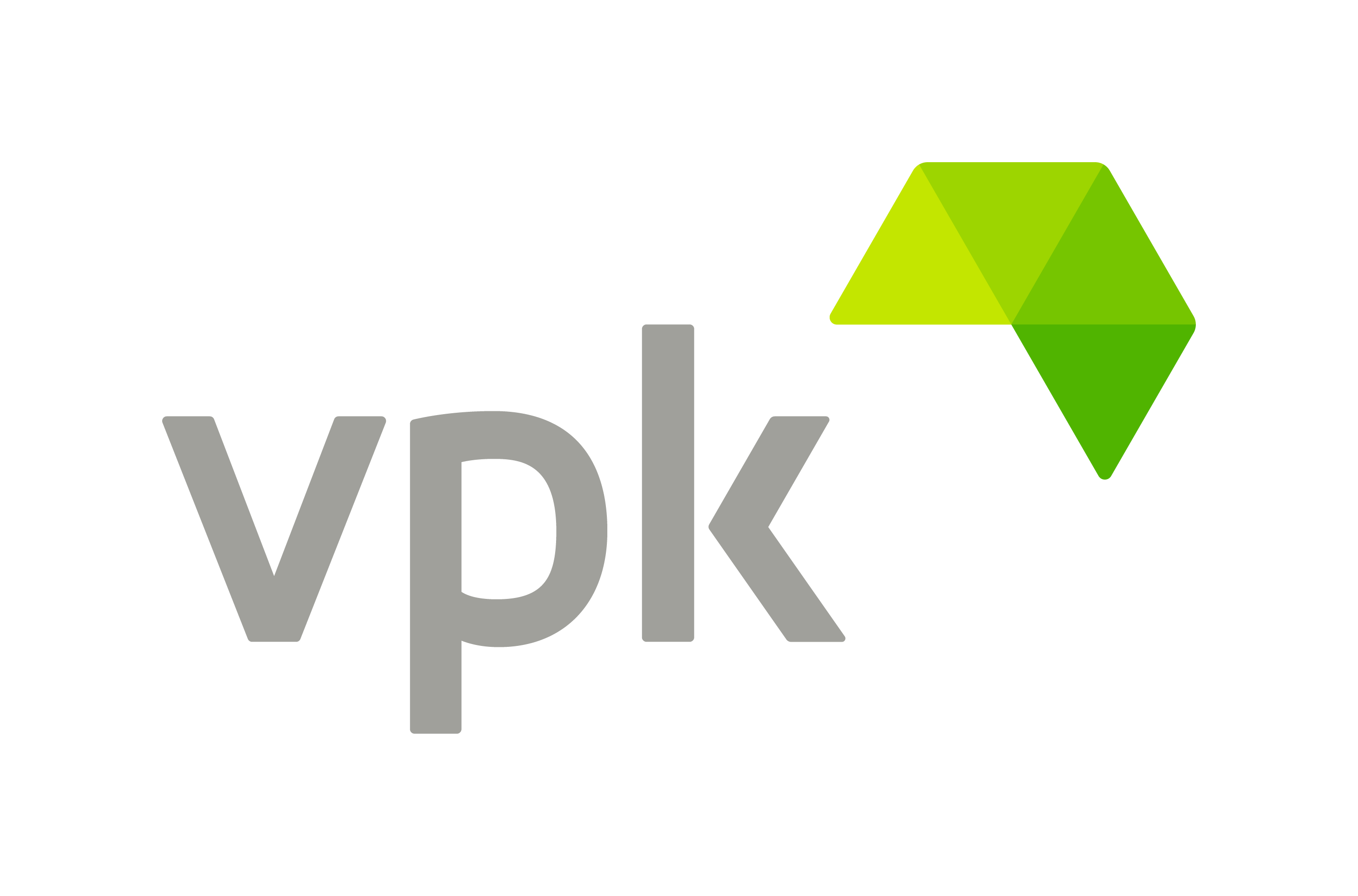
- Company type: Private
- Industry: Packaging
- Founded: 1936; 90 years ago
- Founder: Omer Macharis
- Headquarters: Aalst, Belgium
- Key people: Pierre Macharis (CEO)
- Revenue: ▲€2.1 billion (2022)
- Website: vpkgroup.com

VPK Group is a Belgian paper and cardboard company specializing in the manufacture of corrugated cardboard packaging from recycled paper. It is based in Aalst, Belgium. Pierre Macharis is the current chief executive officer (CEO) of the company.

== History ==
VPK Group was founded in 1936 by Omer Macharis as a paper factory in Oudegem, Belgium. It was later renamed as the United Paper and Board Mills (VPK). After World War II, Fernand Macharis became the head of the company.

In the early 1990s, Pierre Macharis and his brother assumed management of the company from their father, Fernand Macharis.

In 1999, VPK underwent an initial public offering, raising 50 million euros, and was listed on the Brussels Stock Exchange. The funding was used to expand production capacity at the Uniwell corrugated cardboard factory in Raamsdonkveer, Netherlands. During the same period, the company increased its shareholding in the Northern French packaging group, Ondulys and acquired Rigid Group in the UK.

In 2005, VPK expanded its operations into Poland and Romania.

In 2010, VPK acquired Mondi Packaging Saint Quentin, a French corrugated cardboard company, for 20 million euros. Following this acquisition, the company was renamed Ondulys Saint Quentin, aligning with VPK's French corrugated cardboard division.

In 2011, VPK invested 30 million euros in a joint venture, constructing a factory in Leinefelde, Germany.

In 2013, VPK, in a joint venture with Klingele, acquired the UPM Stracel factory in France from UPM.

In 2015, VPK invested 6.5 million euros in a facility in Courcelles, Wallonia, naming the subsidiary Cartonneries de Wallonie.

In 2016, VPK acquired Peterson Packaging, which operated six factories in Scandinavia. As a result, VPK became a packaging supplier for IKEA.

In 2019, VPK acquired the European and Chinese operations of Corenso from NPAC International. As a result of this acquisition, VPK expanded its operations into China.

In 2022, VPK repurposed the Alizay Double A Paper factory in Normandy to produce lightweight recycled containerboard and e-commerce packaging.

In 2023, VPK acquired Arteche Paper, again through its subsidiary Corex. In October 2023, VPK acquired a majority stake in Zetacarton, an Italian corrugated-cardboard producer located near Como. During the same month, VPK also took a minority shareholding in Ribble Packaging, a UK-based specialist in fanfold corrugated board.

In January 2024, VPK Group entered into a 50:50 joint venture with IEMME Packaging, a corrugated-board manufacturer in Gambolò, near Milan. On April 28, 2025, VPK Group completed the acquisition of another Italian firm, Open Imballaggi, a sheet plant specializing in corrugated-cardboard packaging located near Bergamo, Lombardy.

== Awards and recognition ==
- 2023: Award for Best Belgian Sustainability Report
- 2024: Family Business Award of Excellence
