= Visa policy of Ivory Coast =

Policy on permits required to enter Côte d'Ivoire

Visitors to Ivory Coast must obtain a visa from one of the Ivorian diplomatic missions or online unless they come from one of the visa-exempt countries. All visitors must hold a passport valid for at least 6 months.

== Visa policy map ==
Visa policy of Ivory Coast Ivory Coast Visa exempt eVisa

== Visa exemption ==
Citizens of the following countries, as well as refugees and stateless persons residing in these countries, can visit Côte d'Ivoire without a visa for an indefinite period of stay (unless otherwise stated):

- All ECOWAS member states
- Burkina Faso
- Central African Republic ^{1}
- Chad^{1}
- Congo^{1}
- Mali
- Mauritania^{1}
- Morocco^{1}
- Niger
- Philippines^{1}
- Rwanda^{1}
- Seychelles^{1}
- Singapore^{1}
- Tunisia^{1}

_{1 - 90 days}

Date of visa changes
- 30 April 1980: ECOWAS (Economic Community of West African States): Benin, Burkina Faso, Cape Verde, Gambia, Ghana, Guinea, Guinea-Bissau, Liberia, Mali, Niger, Nigeria, Senegal, Sierra Leone, Togo
- 15 March 2013: Central African Republic, Chad, Congo, Mauritania, Morocco, Philippines, Seychelles, Singapore, Tunisia
- 29 March 2013: Haiti (diplomatic, official and service passports)
- 11 June 2019: Rwanda (Note: Under visa exemption agreement on 19 December 2018)

Cancelled

- Unknown: Haiti

Holders of diplomatic or service category passports issued to nationals of Austria, Brazil, China, Gabon, Israel, South Africa, Turkey, Uganda, Venezuela and Vietnam do not require a visa for Côte d'Ivoire.

== Airport e-Visa ==
Visitors can apply online for an e-Visa that if approved can be picked up at the Port Bouet Airport in Abidjan. The e-Visa is valid for 90 days and is issued within 48 hours. At the fee of 73 EUR.

== See also ==
- Visa requirements for Ivorian citizens
