= Confiserie Roodthooft =

Family company producing Belgian sweets and toffees

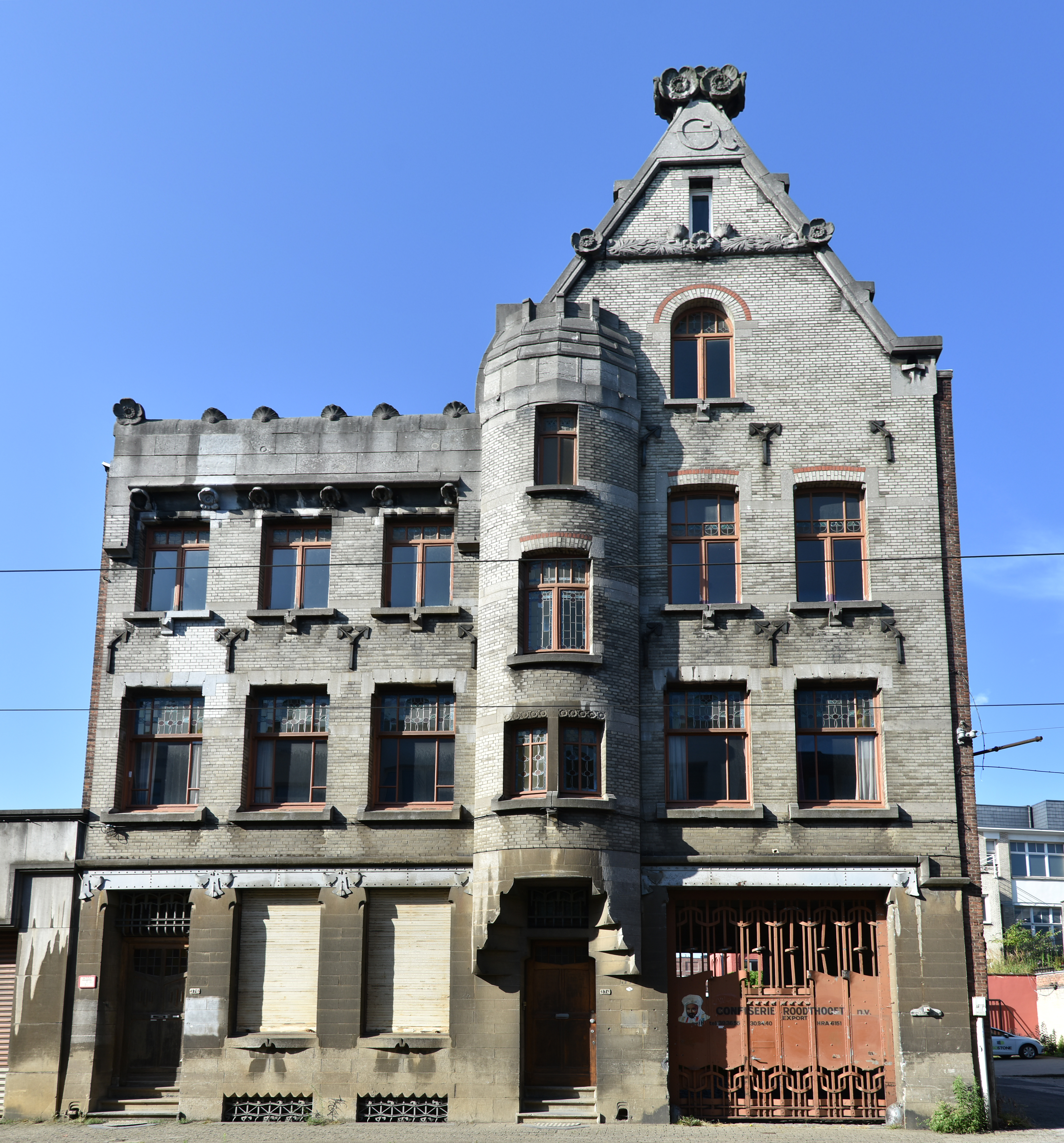
- Type: Private
- Industry: Confectionery
- Founded: 1925; 101 years ago
- Founder: Louis Roodthooft and Johanna Stoops
- Headquarters: Turnhout, Belgium
- Area served: Worldwide
- Key people: Patrick Stoops
- Products: Toffees and confectionery, especially Caramella Mokatine
- Parent: Astra Sweets (since 2022)
- Website: www.roodthooft.com

Confiserie Roodthooft is a family company producing Belgian sweets and toffees. The company was founded by Louis Roodthooft and Johanna Stoops in Antwerp, Belgium in 1925. Roodthooft was in charge of sales whilst Stoops took care of the everyday running of the factory, which was not a usual thing for a Belgian woman to do back then.

The company's most famous product is the 'Caramella Mokatine', also known as the 'Arabier', a coffee-flavoured sweet in a sachetti wrapper. The sachetti wrapper was introduced to Belgium by Louis Roodthooft in 1934. The third-generation family company currently exports to countries all over the world. Their latest range, "Our Original Belgian Toffees" combines original recipes from the 1920s with contemporary packaging.

The company's headquarters are in a listed building built in 1905-7 by former students of Victor Horta.

== History ==
=== Foundation and early years (1925–1933) ===
Confiserie Roodthooft was founded in Antwerp in 1925 by Louis Roodthooft and Johanna Stoops. The company initially operated as a confectionery wholesaler in the Provinciestraat district of Borgerhout, sourcing products from local manufacturers before beginning its own production activities in the late 1920s.

As production expanded, the company moved to larger premises in Sint-Erasmusstraat and Erasmussteeg in Borgerhout, where it manufactured a growing range of confectionery products, including liquorice and coffee-flavoured sweets.

=== Introduction of Mokatine and expansion (1934–1939) ===
In 1934, Confiserie Roodthooft introduced the coffee-flavoured caramel "Caramella Mokatine", later popularly nicknamed "Arabierkes" in Belgium because of the illustrated figure on the wrapper.

According to company accounts, Louis Roodthooft encountered Italian "sachetti"-style candy wrapping techniques during a trip to Italy in 1933. The company subsequently acquired wrapping machinery from the Italian manufacturer ACMA in Bologna and developed a new coffee confection using arabica coffee, sweetened skimmed milk and vegetable fat.

The commercial success of Mokatine contributed significantly to the company's growth during the 1930s. Roodthooft also expanded its export activities and marketed several other confectionery products, including Pickers liquorice toffees.

In 1939, the company reportedly received a gold medal for confectionery products at the New York World's Fair.

=== Lange Leemstraat factory and wartime production (1937–1945) ===
From 1937 onward, production activities were based at a larger industrial complex in Lange Leemstraat in Antwerp. The Art Nouveau site, originally constructed in 1905 as the Albers Creameries butter factory, included offices, a director's residence and factory buildings.

During the World War II, confectionery production declined because of shortages in raw materials and reduced consumer demand. The company temporarily diversified into products such as jam and chocolate substitutes in order to maintain operations.

=== Post-war activities and international development (1945–2015) ===
Following the World War II, Confiserie Roodthooft continued to manufacture confectionery products in Antwerp while developing distribution and export activities.

Under the management of the Stoops family, the company maintained its focus on traditional confectionery products while gradually expanding internationally. Between 2014 and 2017, exports reportedly increased significantly, particularly to markets in Japan and China.

In 2015, the company acquired part of a German confectionery producer and added products such as Salmi, New Orleans and Chewy Toffee to its portfolio.

=== Relocation to Turnhout and acquisition by Astra Sweets (2016–present) ===
In 2016, Confiserie Roodthooft relocated its production facilities from Antwerp to the former Heinz factory site in Turnhout.

In 2019, redevelopment plans were announced for the former Lange Leemstraat factory site. The protected industrial buildings were incorporated into a residential conversion project led by Antwerp-based developers and architects.

In November 2022, the Turnhout-based confectionery manufacturer Astra Sweets acquired Confiserie Roodthooft. Following the acquisition, Patrick Stoops remained involved in research and development activities within the company.

In 2025, Astra Sweets rebranded the Roodthooft Mokatine confectionery brand in collaboration with the Belgian design studio WeWantMore. The redesign modernized the packaging and visual identity of the product for Belgian and international markets.

The rebranding repositioned "Roodthooft" as the main brand name and replaced the previous mascot imagery with a stylized desert oasis illustration.Astra Sweets also introduced a new coffee-flavoured variant alongside the original moka-caramel confection.
