= Copiepresse =

Copiepresse is a Belgian, French-language newspaper copyright management company. Copiepresse successfully sued Google in Belgian court, claiming that Google violated copyright law in posting links to and abstracts of articles in Belgian newspapers without permission.

On May 5, 2011, Google also lost the appeal and subsequently removed several Belgian newspapers represented by Copiepresse from its search index. However, this move backfired on Copiepresse, as the ruling deprived newspapers of click-through traffic, and so it reduced their advertising revenue. Copiepresse backed down on July 18, 2011, allowing Google to index the newspapers again.
