= Group Joos =

The Group Joos is a Belgian graphical company, located in Turnhout, Belgium. It is one of the companies of the printing valley of the Turnhout region.

== History ==
In 1935 Jos Joos founds the printing company Joos as a family-business. He bought a five color rotary printing-press, to be able to print on continuous rolls instead of single sheet printing, which is rather revolutionary in those days. The company specializes in printing for packaging. The company closes during the Second World War and after the war, when in 1960 Wim Joos takes over the management, the company specializes in printing forms for administration (rotary printing). In 1991 the company is completely destroyed in a fire, but is being rebuilt within a year. In 1999 Alex and Yves Joos take over the management of the company from their father. In 2002 the company expands its business to become a Document Management company.

== Sources ==
- Group Joos (history)
