= Regional Investment Company of Wallonia =

The Regional Investment Company of Wallonia (French: Société Régionale d'Investissement de Wallonie or SRIW) was founded by the Walloon Region in 1979 to provide capital to Walloon industry. The purpose of the SRIW, based in Liège, is to invest in the equity of unlisted companies (private equity). The SRIW acts either by purchasing shares of companies, by increasing the capital of the business, by subscribing to a bond issue, or by granting subordinated or convertible loans.

== See also ==
- Brussels Regional Investment Company
- Economy of Belgium
- GIMV
- Science and technology in Flanders
- Science and technology in Wallonia
- Sillon industriel
- SOWALFIN
- Walloon Export and Foreign Investment Agency
