= Thermote & Vanhalst =

Belgian industrial vehicle company

- Founder: Paul Thermote and Paul Vanhalst
- Headquarters: Waregem, Belgium
- Products: Spare parts and accessories for industrial and agricultural equipment
- Number of employees: +6000
- Website: http://www.TVH.com/

Thermote & Vanhalst (also known as TVH) is a Belgian company which provides spare parts and accessories for industrial and agricultural equipment.

== History ==
Thermote & Vanhalst was founded in 1969 by Paul Thermote and Paul Vanhalst. It initially focused on lift trucks and agricultural machinery in Belgium, later expanding to the rest of Europe, Japan, and Australia. Besides providing spare parts for industrial and agricultural equipment, it has partnerships with mining companies, as well as companies focused on ergonomic seating and diagnostic software.

In 2021 TVH Group was split into TVH Parts and Mateco Holding when the co-founding families decided to part ways. Paul Vanhalst's son, Pascal Vanhalst, sold his 40% holding in TVH Parts to D'Ieteren; Ann and Els, the daughters of Paul Thermote, retained their 60% holding.
