= Finance&invest.brussels =

finance&invest.brussels (formerly French: Société Régionale d'Investissement de Bruxelles Dutch: Gewestelijke Investeringsmaatschappij voor Brussel) was founded by the Brussels-Capital Region in 1984 to provide capital to the Brussels-Capital Region industry. The purpose of finance&invest.brussels is to invest in the equity of unlisted companies (private equity).

== See also ==
- Economy of Belgium
- Brussels Enterprises Commerce and Industry
- GIMV
- Regional Investment Company of Wallonia
- Science and technology in the Brussels-Capital Region
- Science and technology in Flanders
- Science and technology in Wallonia

== Sources ==
- Facts from Belgium
- 2007 was recordjaar voor GIMB, De Morgen (in Dutch)
