= Walloon Export and Foreign Investment Agency =

The Walloon Export and Foreign Investment Agency (French: L'Agence wallonne à l'Exportation et aux Investissements étrangers, AWEX) is a public interest organisation in charge of the promotion of foreign trade and the attraction of foreign investments for Wallonia in Belgium. It was created on 1 April 2004 as a merger of the Walloon Export Agency (AWEX) and the Office for foreign Investors (OFI).

== Organisation ==
The Board of Directors of the Walloon Export and Foreign Investment Agency consists of representatives of the Walloon Government, the trade unions and employers associations.

== Structure ==
The AWEX services are divided into:

- Headquarters in Brussels (AWEX) and Namur (OFI);
- Seven regional centres, located in each Walloon province:
  - Charleroi
  - Eupen
  - Libramont
  - Liège
  - Mons
  - Namur
  - Nivelles
- An international economic and commercial network

== See also ==
- FIT
- Regional Investment Company of Wallonia
- Science and technology in Wallonia
- SOWALFIN

== Sources ==
- AWEX
- Wallonia export
- AWEX
