= D'Ieteren Group =

Belgian automobile distributor

Coordinates: 50°49′19″N 4°21′37″E

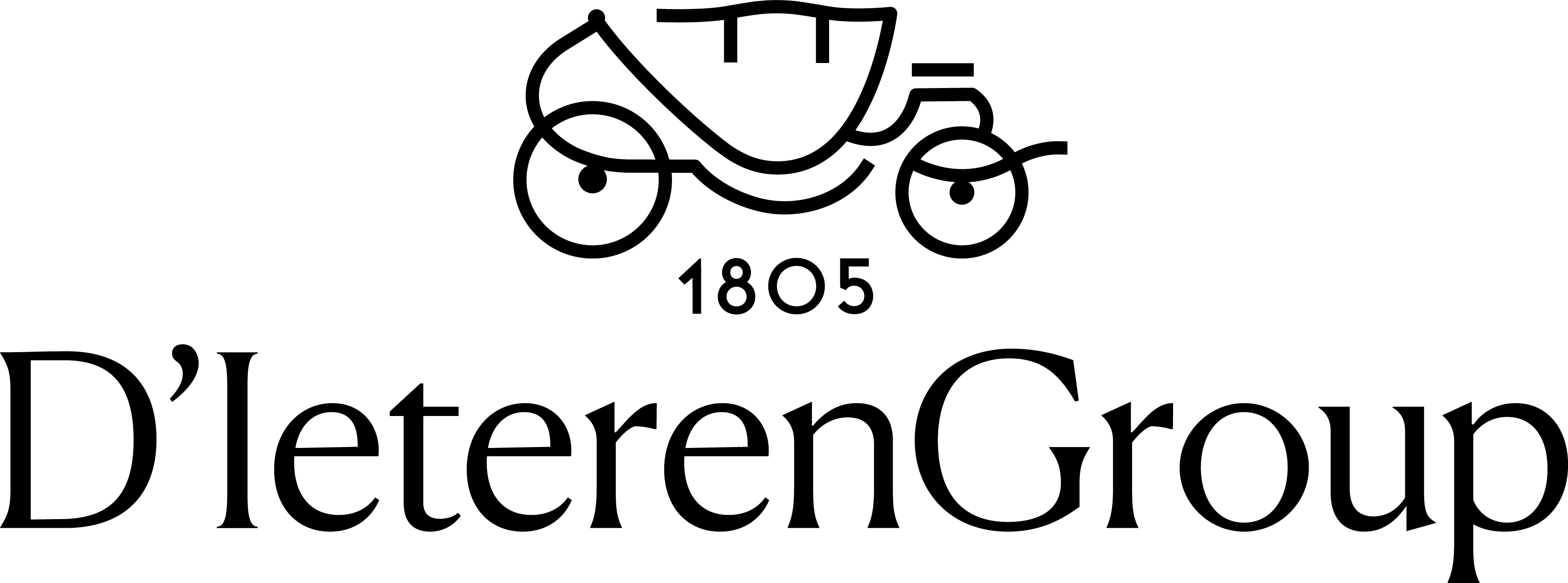
- Formerly: D'Ieteren
- Type: Public
- Traded as: Euronext: DIE
- ISIN: BE0974259880
- Industry: Business Services; Industrials; Mobility Data and Services; Lifestyle Goods and Services
- Founded: 1805; 221 years ago
- Founder: Joseph-Jean D'Ieteren
- Headquarters: 50 Rue du Mail, Brussels, Belgium
- Revenue: 8,155,000,000 (2024)
- Net income: 372,100,000 (2024)
- Website: www.dieterengroup.com

D'Ieteren Group SA/NV is a company based in Belgium that is engaged in automobile distribution and vehicle glass repair and replacement (VGRR) and other industrial activities related to spare parts.

== History ==
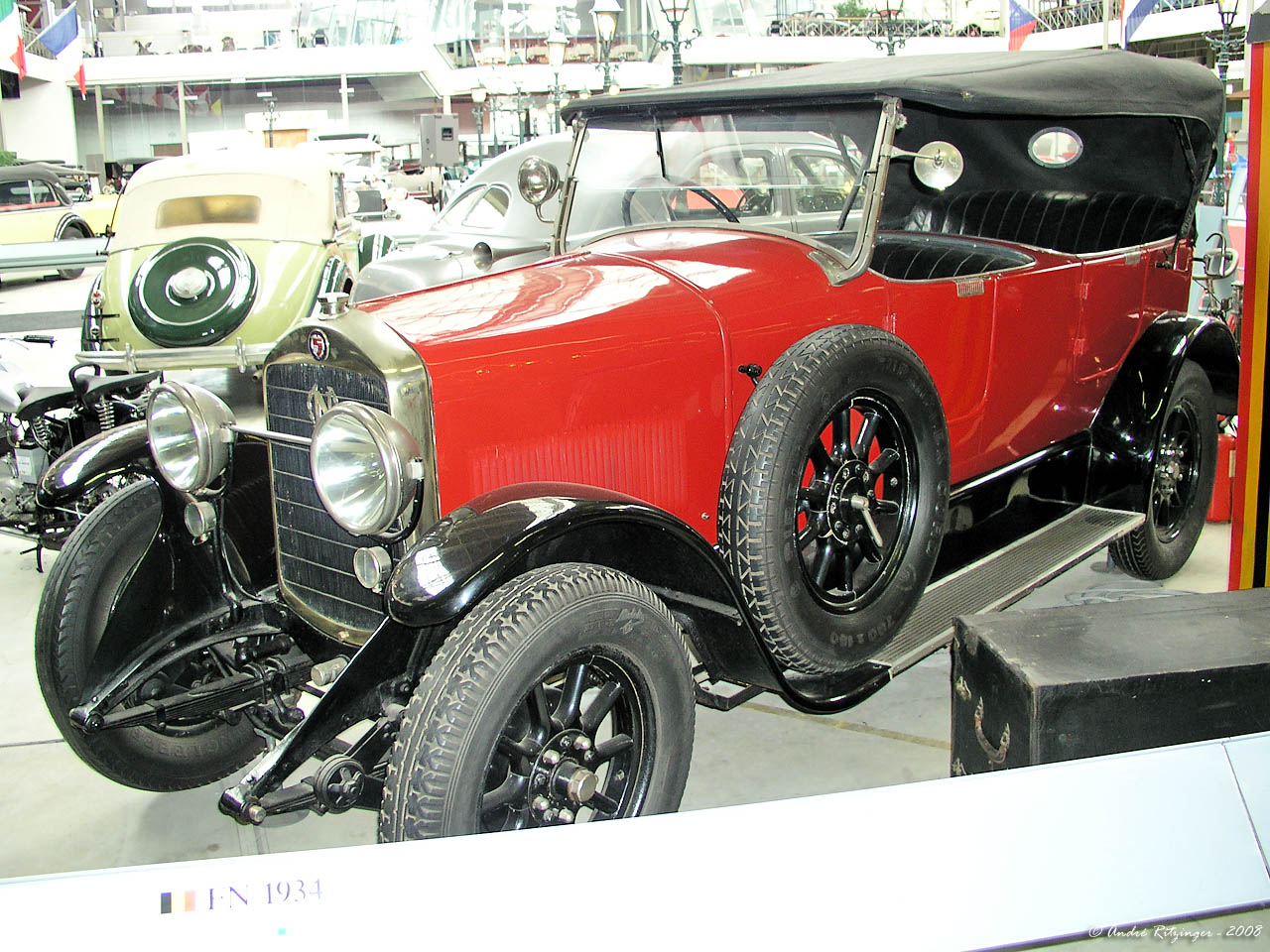
15 HP 4-cylinder car with 4-speed gearbox and 4-wheel brakes and a body by coachbuilder D'Ieteren, made in Belgium by Fabrique d'Armes et d'Automobiles Nagant Frères; front-side view

Founded by master coachbuilder Joseph-Jean D'Ieteren in 1805, who began his first venture in coachbuilding and wheelwrighting, establishing a workshop on the Rue du Marais/Broekstraat. In 1857, his son Alexandre D'Ieteren expanded the business by opening a second location at 106 Rue Neuve/Nieuwstraat, where vehicle painting and garniture were incorporated into the existing trade of coachbuilding and wheelwrighting.

In 1897, D'Ieteren became one of the first companies to produce bodywork for motorized vehicles, signaling a significant transition from traditional horse-drawn carriage manufacturing to automobile bodywork. This shift took place in a newly established workshop located on Chaussée de Charleroi/Charleroisesteenweg. The company continued to grow, and in 1929, the company went public through an initial public offering on the Brussels Stock Exchange, marking its expansion into the financial markets. In 1906, Alfred and Émile D'Ieteren, grandsons of Jean-Joseph D'Ieteren, commissioned the construction of a new premises on Rue du Mail/Maliestraat, which featured an 'ultra-modern workshop' dedicated to bodywork activities. As the company thrived, the premises were expanded and remodeled in successive stages to accommodate its growing business.

The company expanded further in 1931 by becoming the official distributor for several prominent U.S. automobile brands, including Studebaker, Pierce-Arrow, and Auburn. In 1935, D'Ieteren added automobile assembly to its operations, setting up plants for assembling vehicle chassis and bodywork sourced from Studebaker factories. This solidified the company’s position in the international automotive supply chain and contributed to its ongoing growth and diversification.

As D'Ieteren continued to evolve, it transitioned to manufacturing car bodies in the early 20th century, with products exported internationally. It later expanded into the assembly and importation of cars and trucks, eventually becoming a significant player in the global automotive sector. In 1948, Pierre D'Ieteren signed a contract to import vehicles made by the Volkswagen Group and agreed to assemble Volkswagens under license. Construction of a new factory on the south side of Brussels began in October 1948, and by 1949, the first cars were being produced. The factory, which was later sold to Volkswagen in 1970, is now known as Audi Brussels.

D'Ieteren launched its car rental business in 1956 with Dit'Rent-a-Car, a short-term vehicle rental service, which was licensed to Avis two years later. In 1989, D'Ieteren expanded its global footprint by acquiring Avis Europe, a leading short-term vehicle rental company. The company also began importing and distributing other brands of the Volkswagen Group, including Volkswagen, Audi, SEAT, Cupra, Skoda, Bentley, Bugatti, and Lamborghini. It also distributed Yamaha products until 2020.

In the 1960s, the D'Ieteren decided to expand its registered office due to the continuous growth of its activities. This expansion took place in two phases, with additional workshops gradually being added to the central part of the site. The office and commercial building on Rue du Mail, built between 1962 and 1967, was designed in a modernist style with a functionalist slant by architects René Stapels, Robert Bardinet, B. Lefèvre-Feragen, Lemaître, and Jamar. In addition, an industrial building on Rue Américaine/Amerikaanse Straat, originally built in modernist style by architect Fernand Baudoux in 1956, was expanded towards Place Albert Leemans/Albert Leemansplein by René Stapels in 1963. The facade was heavily remodelled, losing much of its original design.

In 1969, Stapels proposed the renovation of the garages for car maintenance, which included an underground car park, an elevated car park, and an interior street, along with new spaces for services, all aimed at occupying the entire site along Rue du Prévôt/Provooststraat.

D'Ieteren acquired Belron in 1999, in vehicle glass repair and replacement. Belron operates in Europe and Brazil under the brand names Carglass and Autoglass (Ireland, United Kingdom, Poland), in North America (Canada, United States) as Safelite and Speedy Glass, in Australia under the brand name O'Brien, and in New Zealand under the brand name Smith & Smith. In 2011, D'Ieteren withdrew from short-term vehicle rental by selling its 59.6% stake in Avis Europe to Avis Budget Group. In 2016, D'Ieteren acquired Moleskine. In 2018, D'Ieteren strengthened its investment capacity by selling a minority 40% stake in Belron to the international investment company CD&R.

In 2021, D'Ieteren carved out its vehicle distribution and retail business into a new fully owned subsidiary. The two businesses, until then part of D'Ieteren SA/NV, became two separate entities: D'Ieteren Group and D'Ieteren Automotive, each receiving a new graphic identity and logo. That same year, D'Ieteren Group announced the acquisition of a 40% stake in Thermote & Vanhalst. Headquartered in Waregem, Belgium, TVH Parts is in the independent distribution of aftermarket parts for material handling, construction & industrial, and agricultural equipment, present in 26 countries across all continents. In 2022, D'Ieteren Group acquired Parts Holding Europe (PHE), a Western European company in the independent distribution of vehicle spare parts, present in six countries: France, Belgium, The Netherlands, Luxembourg, Italy, and Spain.

== Activities ==
The group activities consists of five different branches.

1. D'Ieteren Automotive imports and distributes Volkswagen, Audi, Škoda, Seat, Cupra, Porsche, Bentley, Lamborghini, Bugatti, and Maserati vehicles across Belgium.
2. Belron (94.85% owned) performs vehicle glass repair and replacement. 2,400 branches and 8,600 mobile vans, trading under 15 different brands including Carglass, Autoglass and Safelite, serve customers in 35 countries.
3. Moleskine is an Italian manufacturer, papermaker, and product designer founded in 1997 by Francesco Franceschi, based in Milan, Italy. It produces and designs luxury notebooks, as well as planners, sketchbooks, leather backpacks, holdalls, journals, wallets, various accessories, and stationery.
4. Parts Holding Europe (PHE) is in the independent distribution of spare parts for light and heavy vehicles in Western Europe, especially in France, Belgium, the Netherlands, Luxembourg, Italy and Spain.
5. TVH (40% owned) is a parts manufacturer and retailer specialised for industrial and agricultural sectors.
