= Belgian nationality law =

Belgian nationality code Code de la nationalité belge Wetboek van de Belgische nationaliteit

Parliament of Belgium
- Long title: Code de la nationalité belge / Wetboek van de Belgische nationaliteit
- Enacted by: Government of Belgium
- Enacted: 28 June 1984
- Status: Amended

Belgian nationality law provides for the conditions in which a person holds Belgian nationality and is based on a mixture of the principles of jus sanguinis and jus soli.

== History ==
=== Pre-1984 ===
Belgian nationality was historically governed by a law dating from 14 December 1932. This law was modified by further laws passed in 1951, 1961, 1964, 1965 and 1967.

In 1963, Belgium signed the Strasbourg Convention on Multiple Nationality, which aimed to reduce cases of multiple nationalities following naturalisation.

Until 1967, nationality was subject to relatively stricter rules, which meant that children born to a Belgian mother were not accorded Belgian nationality. As a result, there are several notable cases of well-known people who did not receive Belgian nationality including Pierre Arditi, Audrey Hepburn, Catherine Arditi, Jacques Higelin and Patrick Modiano.

=== Post-1984 ===
In the early 1980s, the Belgian government undertook a comprehensive reform of Belgian nationality law. The result was the Belgian nationality code, which was legislated on 28 June 1984 and largely took effect on 1 January 1985. The code has since been modified several times, including in 1991, 1993, 1995, 1998, 2000, 2004, 2006, 2012, 2013, 2014, 2015, 2017 and 2018. The most recent modifications (legislated in 2018) entered into force in 2019.

In 2002, Belgium denounced the Strasbourg Convention, which opened up the path to allowing for multiple nationality following naturalisation. In 2008, the country removed its last remaining provisions that prevented the acquisition of multiple nationalities.

In 2014, Belgium acceded to the 1961 Convention on the Reduction of Statelessness.

== Legal framework ==
=== Legislation ===
The primary legal text is the Belgian nationality code (Code de la nationalité belge (C.N.B.) / Wetboek van de Belgische nationaliteit (W.B.N.)). The code is supplemented by various royal decrees (arrêtés royaux / koninklijke besluiten) that govern the execution of the code. In the event of inconsistency between the code and the royal decrees, the code takes precedence.

All changes to Belgian law are published in the Belgian official journal (Moniteur belge / Belgisch Staatsblad).

The most comprehensive legal treatise on Belgian nationality is Traité de la nationalité en droit belge by Charles-Louis Closset and Bernadette Renauld, which was first published in 1993 and updated with a second edition in 2004 and a third edition in 2015.

=== Administration ===
The majority of nationality-related administration is conducted by Belgian municipalities (communes / gemeente) and Belgian diplomatic missions (including embassies and consulates, all falling under the jurisdiction of FPS Foreign Affairs). Where a person is required to make a declaration (déclaration / verklaring), this must usually be made at the municipality or diplomatic mission where they are registered. Certain declarations can only be made in Belgium at municipalities, while other declarations can only be made abroad at diplomatic missions.

The FPS Interior maintains a National Register (Registre National / Rijksregister) of citizens and foreigners residing on Belgian territory. Belgian nationality is usually encoded in this register, along with the way in which the citizen derives their nationality. However, Belgian nationality is ultimately a question of law and fact, and therefore omission from the National Register does not necessarily mean that a person does not have Belgian nationality.

Anyone listed in the National Register has the right to inspect their record and request for it to be corrected if it is inaccurate. A Belgian citizen may obtain a certificate of nationality from the National Register website, or from the municipality or embassy where they are registered (which will obtain the certificate from the National Register system on the citizen's behalf).

== Attribution of Belgian nationality ==
A child can be attributed Belgian nationality at birth by being born to a Belgian citizen or born in Belgium, with conditions.

=== Birth to a Belgian citizen ===
Birth to a Belgian parent is the most common route for attribution of Belgian nationality. Due to the reform of the Belgian nationality code in 1984, the conditions attached depend principally on whether one was born before or after these reforms came into effect.

==== Birth on or before 31 December 1984 ====
A person born on or before 31 December 1984 is attributed Belgian nationality if the person is:

- born in wedlock (legitimately) to a male Belgian citizen OR;
- born out of wedlock and first parentally acknowledged by Belgian citizen.

In addition to the above provisions, a person who was born between 1 January 1967 and 31 December 1984, and who fulfils one of the conditions below relating to those born on or after 1 January 1985, is automatically attributed Belgian nationality taking effect on 1 January 1985.

==== Birth on or after 1 January 1985 ====
A person born on or after 1 January 1985 is attributed Belgian nationality if the person is:

- born in Belgium to a Belgian citizen OR;
- born abroad to a Belgian citizen born in Belgium or the Belgian Congo before 30 June 1960 or in Rwanda or Burundi before 1 July 1962 OR;
- born abroad to a Belgian citizen born abroad and the parent submits an attribution declaration (déclaration attributive / verklaring tot toekenning) within five years of birth OR;
- born abroad to a Belgian citizen born abroad and the parent did not submit an attribution declaration within five years of birth, but the child holds no other nationality before turning 18 years old (and so would be stateless).

A child (under 18 years old) adopted by a Belgian citizen is attributed Belgian nationality on the same basis as the above conditions relating to birth to a Belgian citizen, with effect from the adoption date. These rules apply to adoptions since 1 January 1988; different rules apply for adoptions prior to 1988.

=== Birth in Belgium ===
A person born in Belgium to foreign parents is attributed Belgian nationality if the person:

- holds no other nationality before turning 18 years old (and so would be stateless) OR;
- loses their only other nationality before turning 18 years old (and so would be stateless) OR;
- has a parent who was born in Belgium and resident in Belgium for five of the 10 years before the person's birth OR;
- has lived in Belgium since birth and has two foreign parents (or foreign adoptive parents) who were born abroad and resident in Belgium for 10 years and make an attribution declaration before the person's 12th birthday OR;
- is adopted by a foreign parent and the foreign parent was born in Belgium and resident in Belgium for five of the 10 years before the adoption took effect.

Effectively these clauses result in Belgian nationality being attributed to the children of long-resident immigrants and the grandchildren of immigrants.

== Acquisition of Belgian nationality ==
Belgian nationality can be acquired later in life (i.e. not at birth) through "declaration" or "naturalisation". The distinction is that declaration is a legal right, based on meeting the conditions, whereas naturalisation is a privilege that the government can decide whether or not to accord.

Declaration is now the principal route through which foreigners can acquire Belgian nationality, and naturalisation has become extremely rare. Approximately 30,000 to 40,000 people acquire Belgian nationality per year. In 2020, 32,663 people acquired Belgian nationality. The most common countries of origin have historically been Morocco, Romania, Poland, the United Kingdom and Italy.

It is no longer possible to acquire Belgian nationality through marriage (abolished in 1985) or through the "option" procedure between the ages of 18 and 22 years old (abolished in 2013).

=== Declaration ===
A person at least 18 years old can obtain Belgian nationality through declaration if the person meets one of the following criteria:

- born in Belgium and resident in Belgium since birth OR;
- resident in Belgium for five years and satisfies language, social and economic integration requirements OR;
- resident in Belgium for five years and married to a Belgian citizen for three years and satisfies a social integration requirement OR;
- resident in Belgium for five years and is handicapped, invalid or retired OR;
- resident in Belgium for 10 years and satisfies a language requirement and proves integration in their community through any means possible.

The declaration should be made according to the procedure outlined in the "Nationality declarations" section below.

=== Naturalisation ===
A person at least 18 years old may apply for naturalisation if the person possesses exceptional merits in the fields of sport, culture, or science, which would contribute to the international influence of the country. Applicants must have a permanent residence permit, but no residence period is formally required. The person must also explain why they cannot obtain Belgian nationality by declaration. A fee of €1000 is payable for the consideration of the application.

Naturalisation applications are considered by the Belgian Chamber Committee on Naturalisations.

Prior to 1 January 2013, any person at least 18 years old could apply for naturalisation after being resident in Belgium for three years.

=== Children ===
A child under 18 years old automatically acquires Belgian nationality if one of their parents acquires Belgian nationality.

== Loss of Belgian nationality ==
Belgian nationality can be lost through renunciation, deprivation, residence overseas (satisfying specific criteria) or in certain cases applying to children.

=== Renunciation ===
A Belgian citizen at least 18 years old may renounce their Belgian nationality by making a declaration of renunciation (déclaration de renonciation / verklaring van afstand), but this only takes effect if they hold or are about to acquire another citizenship.

=== Deprivation ===
A Belgian citizen (except if they derive their Belgian nationality from a Belgian parent) can be deprived of their Belgian nationality if the person:

- acquired their Belgian nationality through fraud or false information (such as having entered into a marriage of convenience) OR;
- is in serious breach of his or her obligations as a Belgian citizen (such as being sentenced to prison for 5 or more years).

In these circumstances, the registrar issues a deprivation order (acte de déchéance / vervallensverklaring) through the Court of Appeal.

=== Residence overseas ===
A Belgian citizen born abroad on or after 1 January 1967 will lose their Belgian nationality upon turning 28 years old if the person:

- was resident abroad from the ages of 18 to 28 (i.e. they did not reside in Belgium during this period) AND;
- did not work for the Belgian government or a Belgian company or other Belgian organisation AND;
- did not make a declaration of conservation (déclaration de conservation / behoudsverklaring) at their local embassy between the ages of 18 and 28 AND;
- holds one or more other nationalities.

Since 12 July 2018, a person in the above circumstances will no longer lose their Belgian nationality if they apply for and obtain a Belgian passport or identity card between the ages of 18 and 28. However, this provision does not apply retroactively; therefore the person had to have been under 28 years old on 12 July 2018 for it to apply.

Historically, Belgian citizens in the above circumstances had to make further declarations of conservation every 10 years to avoid losing their Belgian nationality, but now the declaration must only be made once before the age of 28.

A person who has lost their Belgian nationality in the above circumstances may request a letter from their local embassy confirming their loss of nationality.

=== Cases applying to children ===
A child under 18 years old loses Belgian nationality if:

- their parent loses Belgian nationality, but not where the loss is through deprivation, the other parent remains a Belgian citizen or the child would be left stateless OR;
- the child is adopted by a foreigner and the child acquires another nationality upon adoption, unless one of the adoptive parents is a Belgian citizen OR;
- the child acquired Belgian nationality on the grounds of being stateless, but goes on to acquire another nationality before turning 18 years old.

=== Voluntary acquisition of another citizenship (historical) ===
Historically, Belgium had provisions whereby a person at least 18 years old who voluntarily obtained another nationality would automatically lose their Belgian nationality. Before 9 June 2007, this applied in respect of voluntarily obtaining any other nationality. From 9 June 2007 to 28 April 2008, this only applied in respect of voluntarily obtaining the nationality of a country that was still a signatory to the 1963 Strasbourg Convention on Multiple Nationality (i.e. Austria, Denmark, France, Ireland, Italy, Luxembourg, the Netherlands, Norway, Spain or the United Kingdom).

Note that the acquisition of the other citizenship had to be voluntary. Being born with another citizenship never led to the loss of Belgian nationality. Therefore, it has always been possible to hold Belgian citizenship and other citizenship(s) by birth.

However, the above provisions were all removed from law effective 28 April 2008. A person who voluntarily obtains another nationality after this date will no longer lose their Belgian nationality, regardless of the nationality acquired.

== Recovery of Belgian nationality ==
A person who has lost their Belgian nationality (other than by deprivation) may recover it by making a recovery declaration (déclaration de recouvrement / verklaring tot herkrijgen). The person must be at least 18 years old AND resident in Belgium for 12 months before making the declaration. The residence period is thus considerably shorter than the usual requirement of 5 or 10 years.

The declaration should be made according to the procedure outlined in the "Nationality declarations" section below.

Approximately 50 to 100 people recover Belgian nationality per year.

A person who lost their Belgian nationality and satisfies the conditions for recovering it (except for the 12 month residence requirement) has the right to enter and live in Belgium indefinitely (even without ever making a recovery declaration, if the person does not wish to do so). This rarely-publicised and extremely rarely-exercised right is provided for under Article 10 of the Loi sur l'accès au territoire, le séjour, l'établissement et l'éloignement des étrangers of 15 December 1980.

=== Recovery after renunciation ===
A person who renounced their Belgian nationality must describe the circumstances of the renunciation and their reasons for wanting to recover nationality. The Crown Prosecutor has some latitude to approve or decline such applications based on the description/reasons provided.

=== Recovery after residence overseas ===
A person who lost their Belgian nationality following residence overseas (as per the criteria described above under "Loss of Belgian nationality") must normally return to Belgium and reside in Belgium for 12 months before making a recovery declaration.

However, since 2018, it is also possible to make a recovery declaration while resident abroad, but only if the person can satisfactorily explain why it was impossible for them to make the declaration of conservation between the ages of 18 and 28. Such a person (resident abroad) must describe the circumstances by which they lost their nationality and their reasons for wanting to recover nationality. The Crown Prosecutor has some latitude to approve or decline such applications (from a person resident abroad) based on the description/reasons provided.

A person resident in Belgium does not need to demonstrate that it was impossible for them to make the declaration of conservation.

== Nationality declarations ==
A person seeking to make a declaration to acquire or recover Belgian nationality must satisfy various requirements and follow a standard procedure, as follows:

=== Residence period ===
The person is required to have had their main residence in Belgium for the prescribed period on a legal and uninterrupted basis. This condition can be satisfied by having continuously held an identity card of type A, B, C, D, EU/EU+, F/F+, H or M, or a series of these cards.

Additionally, EU citizens benefit from a "declarative" right of residence, and can therefore count their legal residence as beginning from the day they first registered at their municipality, rather than the day on which they were first issued their identity card, which could be weeks or months later. For example, in the case of a holder of an E card, the person may count the period during which they held an "Annexe 19" indicating they had requested an E card.

During the prescribed residence period, the person cannot have been absent from Belgium for more than six consecutive months OR one fifth of the total period.

=== Right to permanent residence ===
The person is also required, as at the time of the declaration, to hold the right to continue residing in Belgium indefinitely. This condition can be satisfied by producing an identity card of type B, C, K, L, EU/EU+, F/F+ or M. Identity cards of type A or H are not valid as they provide only a temporary right of residence.

=== Declaration text ===
The person is required to sign a statement, which includes the following text written out by hand:

“I declare my desire to acquire the Belgian nationality and to submit myself to the Constitution, the laws of Belgium, and to the Convention for the Protection of Human Rights and Fundamental Freedoms.”

(“Je déclare vouloir acquérir la nationalité belge et me soumettre à la Constitution, aux lois du peuple belge et à la Convention de sauvegarde des droits de l’homme et des libertés fondamentales.” /

"Ik verklaar Belgisch staatsburger te willen worden en de Grondwet, de wetten van het Belgische volk en het Verdrag tot bescherming van de rechten van de mens en de fundamentele vrijheden te zullen naleven.")

=== Other requirements ===
A birth certificate is almost always required, except in a few limited scenarios where it would be impossible to obtain one. The birth certificate must be legalised in the country of origin (unless there is an international treaty in place), and a sworn translation into one of the national languages must be appended (unless the document is already in one of these languages).

Depending on the selected route, the person may be required to satisfy a language requirement and/or prove other types of social/economic integration. For a recovery declaration, the person does not need to satisfy any language or integration requirements.

Most declarations require payment of a fee of €1000. However, for a recovery declaration, there is no fee (i.e. the procedure is free). Some municipalities levy additional taxes/fees, such as a €50 fee in Brussels.

=== Procedure ===
Nationality declarations must be submitted at the registrar in the person's municipality in Belgium. The registrar is only responsible for collating the required documents and is not responsible for approving the declaration.

The declaration file is then transferred to the King's Prosecutor (also known as the Crown Prosecutor) (Procureur du Roi / Procureur des Konings) for review, which lasts up to four months. The prosecutor will check that the person satisfies the criteria, as well as whether there are any serious negative facts (faits personnels graves / gewichtige feiten eigen) that would preclude the person from being accorded Belgian nationality (such as a criminal record or terrorist links).

If the prosecutor issues a positive decision or does not issue a decision within the allocated time period of four months, the person becomes a Belgian citizen. The municipal registrar draws up a corresponding act (acte de nationalité belge / akte van Belgische nationaliteit) and updates the person's record in the National Register. The person concerned is then invited to apply for a Belgian citizens' identity card. The names of new citizens are periodically published in the Belgian official journal (Moniteur belge / Belgisch Staatsblad).

If the prosecutor issues a negative decision, the person concerned is notified and given the opportunity to appeal the decision through the courts.

== Dual citizenship ==
Following legal changes that took effect on 28 April 2008, Belgian citizens are allowed to voluntarily acquire and hold any other citizenships without losing their Belgian nationality. Belgian law therefore permits multiple/dual citizenship. However, other countries may not permit multiple/dual citizenship, which could require the renunciation of Belgian nationality.

As far as the Belgian government is concerned, they only consider whether a person is or is not a Belgian citizen; they do not make distinctions based on which other nationalities a person may hold.

== Benefits of Belgian nationality ==
=== Rights and responsibilities ===
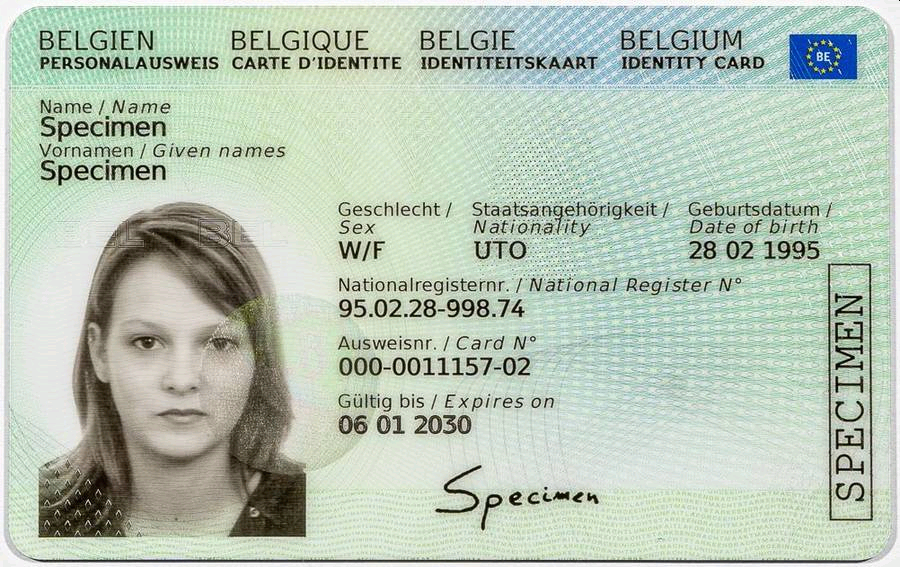
Belgian identity card

Belgian citizens are entitled to certain fundamental rights as set out in the Belgian Constitution. Citizens are entitled to hold a Belgian identity card and a Belgian passport.

Citizens living in Belgium are required to register with their local municipality, through which they gain access to a variety of government services. While registered as resident, they are required to vote in elections. They are also required to hold a Belgian identity card and carry it on them at all times outside their home.

Citizens living abroad have the option, but not the obligation, to register with their local Belgian embassy or consulate, through which they can request some of the same services, such as renewing an identity card or passport.

=== Quality of nationality ===
As of 2018, Belgian nationality was ranked 11th in the Quality of Nationality Index (QNI), which ranks nationalities on a broader range of factors including economic strength, human development, ease of travel, political stability and overseas employment opportunities for their citizens.

In 2020, Belgium was accorded a UN Human Development Index (HDI) score of 0.931, ranking the country 14th for quality of life.

=== Citizenship of the European Union ===
Because Belgium forms part of the European Union, Belgian citizens are also citizens of the European Union under European Union law.

Belgian citizens thus enjoy the right of free movement to live and work in any country within the EU/EEA/Switzerland, as granted in Article 21 of the EU Treaty. Additionally, Belgian citizens have the right to vote in European Parliament elections and local elections in the European country where they reside.

When in a non-EU country where there is no Belgian embassy, Belgian citizens have the right to seek consular protection from the embassy of any other EU country present in that country.

=== Travel freedom ===
Visa requirements for Belgian citizens

Belgian citizens enjoy a high degree of travel freedom. As of 13 April 2021, Belgian citizens had visa-free or visa-on-arrival access to 187 countries and territories, ranking the Belgian passport 7th in the world according to the Henley Passport Index.
