= Chamber of Representatives (Belgium) =

Lower house of the Belgian Federal Parliament

Coordinates: 50°50′48″N 4°21′53″E

(in official languages)
German	Abgeordnetenkammer
French	Chambre des représentants
Dutch	Kamer van Volksvertegenwoordigers
- 56th legislature

Type
- Type: Lower house

Leadership
- President: Peter De Roover, N-VA since 10 July 2024

Structure
- Seats: 150
- Political groups: Government (De Wever Cabinet) (80): N-VA (23); MR (18); LE (15); Vooruit (13); CD&V (11); Supported by (1): Independent (1); Opposition (69): VB (20); PS (16); PVDA-PTB (15); Anders (8) (Note: Including Alexia Bertrand (Anders), elected on MR's Brussels list, but has chosen to sit in the Dutch-speaking language group, and therefore together with Anders in parliament.); Groen (6); Ecolo (3); DéFI (1)
- Length of term: 5 years

Elections
- Voting system: Open list proportional representation within eleven constituencies, with 5% constituency electoral thresholds
- Last election: 9 June 2024
- Next election: On or before 2029

Meeting place
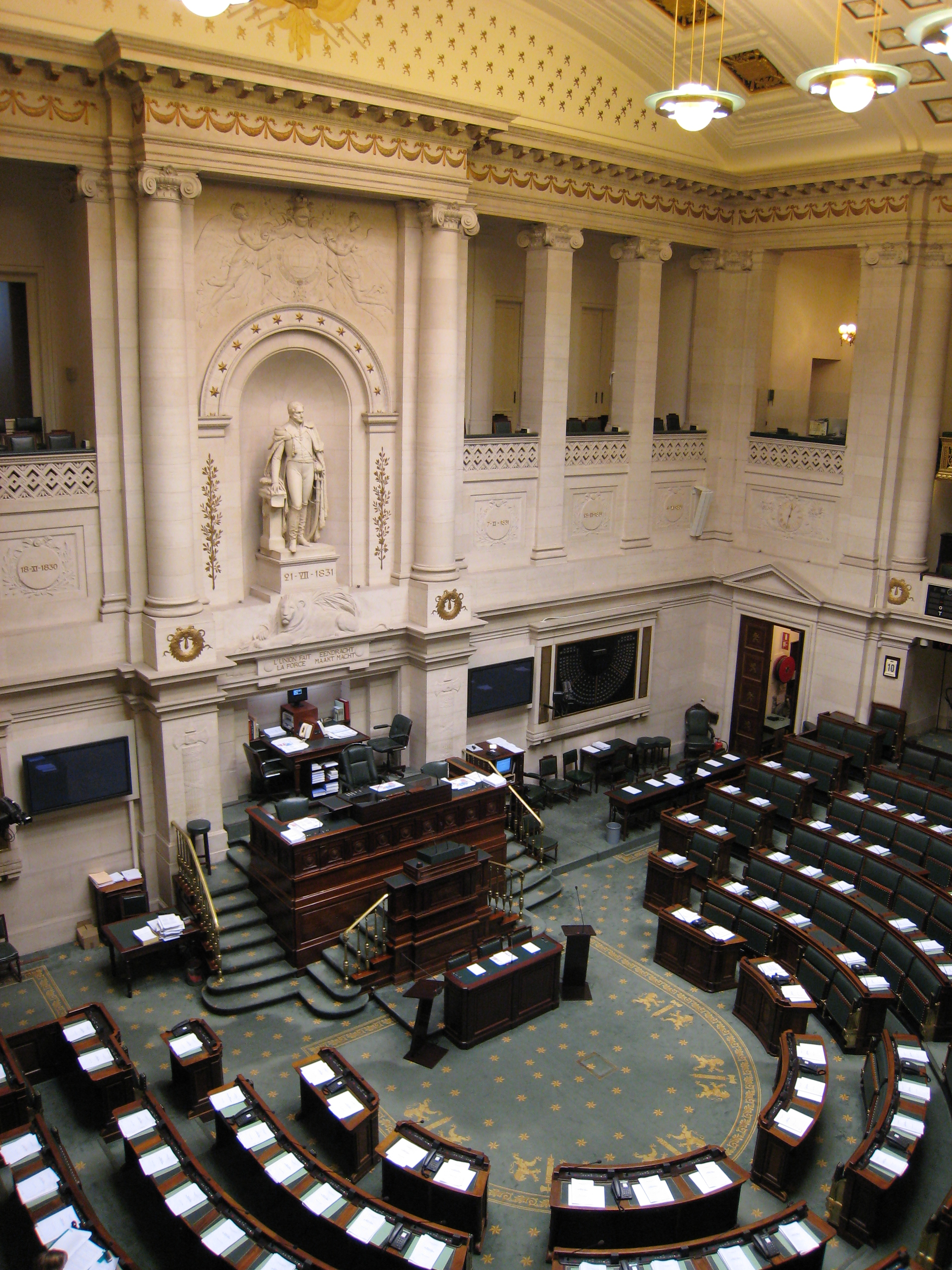
- Palace of the Nation, Brussels

Website
- www.dekamer.be lachambre.be

Rules
- Rules of Procedure of the Belgian House of Representatives (English)

The Chamber of Representatives (Dutch: Kamer van Volksvertegenwoordigers; (Note: Dutch pronunciation: [ˈkaːmər vɑɱ ˈvɔlksfərteːɣə(n)ˌʋoːrdəɣərs].) French: Chambre des représentants; (Note: French pronunciation: [ʃɑ̃bʁ de ʁəpʁezɑ̃tɑ̃].) German: Abgeordnetenkammer (Note: German pronunciation: [ˈapɡəʔɔʁdnətn̩ˌkamɐ].)) is one of the two chambers in the bicameral Federal Parliament of Belgium, the other being the Senate. It is considered to be the "lower house" of the Federal Parliament.

== Members and elections ==
Article 62 of the Belgian Constitution fixes the number of seats in the Chamber of Representatives at 150. There are 11 electoral districts, which correspond with the ten provinces (five Dutch- and five French-speaking) and the Brussels-Capital Region. Prior to the sixth Belgian state reform, the province of Flemish Brabant was divided into two electoral districts: one for Leuven and the other, named Brussels-Halle-Vilvoorde (BHV), which encompassed both the 19 bilingual municipalities from the Brussels-Capital Region and the 35 Dutch-speaking municipalities of Halle-Vilvoorde in Flemish Brabant, including seven municipalities with linguistic facilities for French-speaking inhabitants.

The seats are divided among the political parties using the D'Hondt method of proportional representation in several districts, which slightly favours large parties and coalitions. There is an electoral threshold of 5% in each district.

The representatives are divided into two so-called "language groups". Of the total of 150 representatives, 88 are part of the Dutch-language group, which consists of representatives from the Dutch-language area, and 62 are part of the French-language group, which consists of representatives from the French-language area and the German-language area. For the representatives from the Brussels region, the language in which they take their oath as a representative determines which language group they belong to. Following the 2007 federal election, the Chamber has a German-speaking member (Kattrin Jadin) for the first time since 1999.

Nevertheless, because of the Belgian constitution, both linguistic communities are granted equal powers in the parliament. Although in general bills can be passed without a majority in both linguistic groups, bills relating to specific issues (so-called 'community laws') cannot and need the consent of both language groups.

The following table shows the current (2026) distribution of seats between the language groups and the electoral districts.

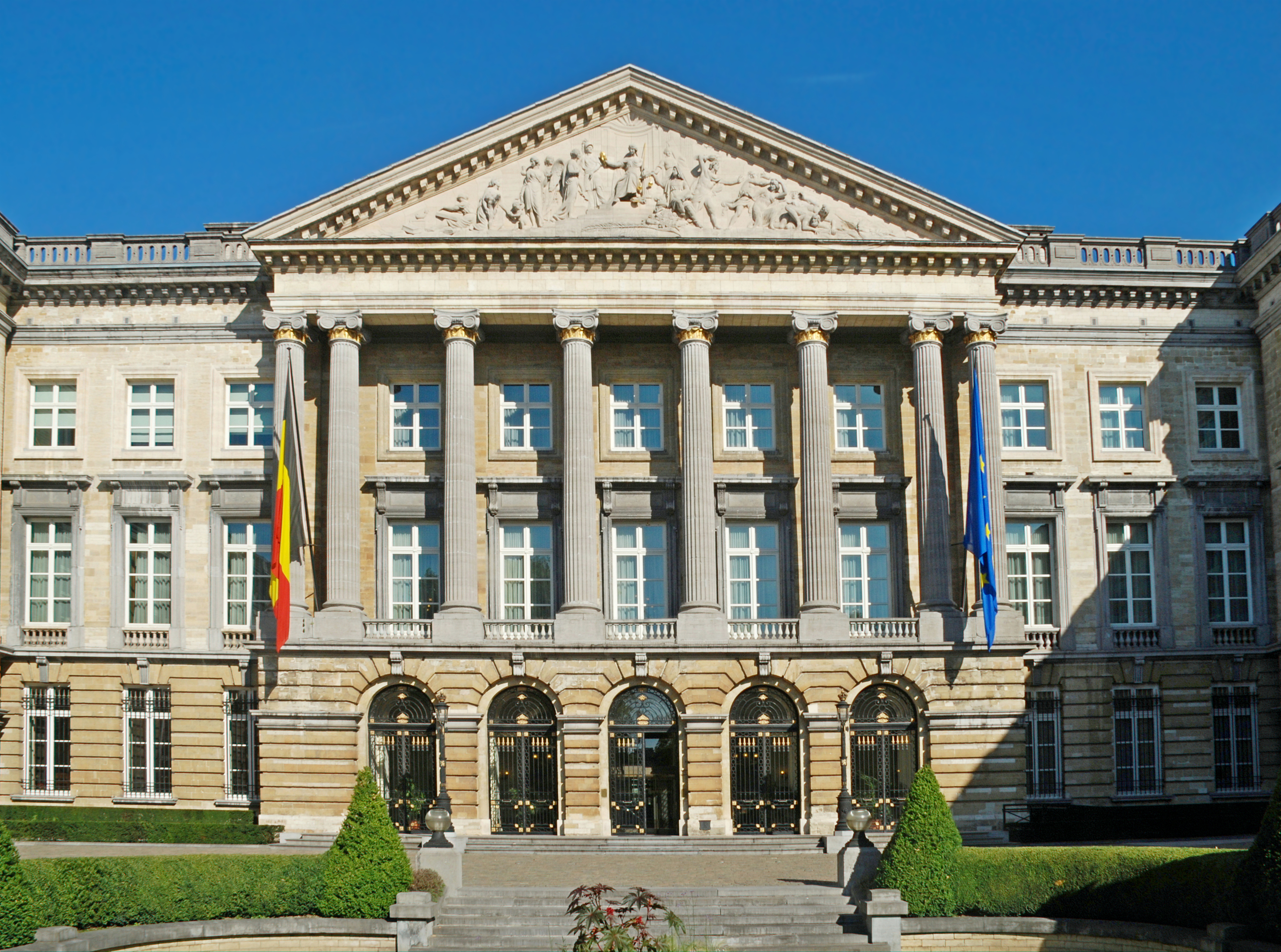
The Palace of the Nation in Brussels, home to both Chambers of the Federal Parliament of Belgium

Dutch language group		French language group	
Electoral district	Seats	Electoral district	Seats
Brussels Capital Region (bilingual)	2/16	Brussels Capital Region (bilingual)	14/16
Antwerp	24	Hainaut	17
East Flanders	20	Liège	14
Flemish Brabant	15	Luxembourg	4
Limburg	12	Namur	7
West Flanders	16	Walloon Brabant	5
Total	89	Total	61

== Qualifications ==
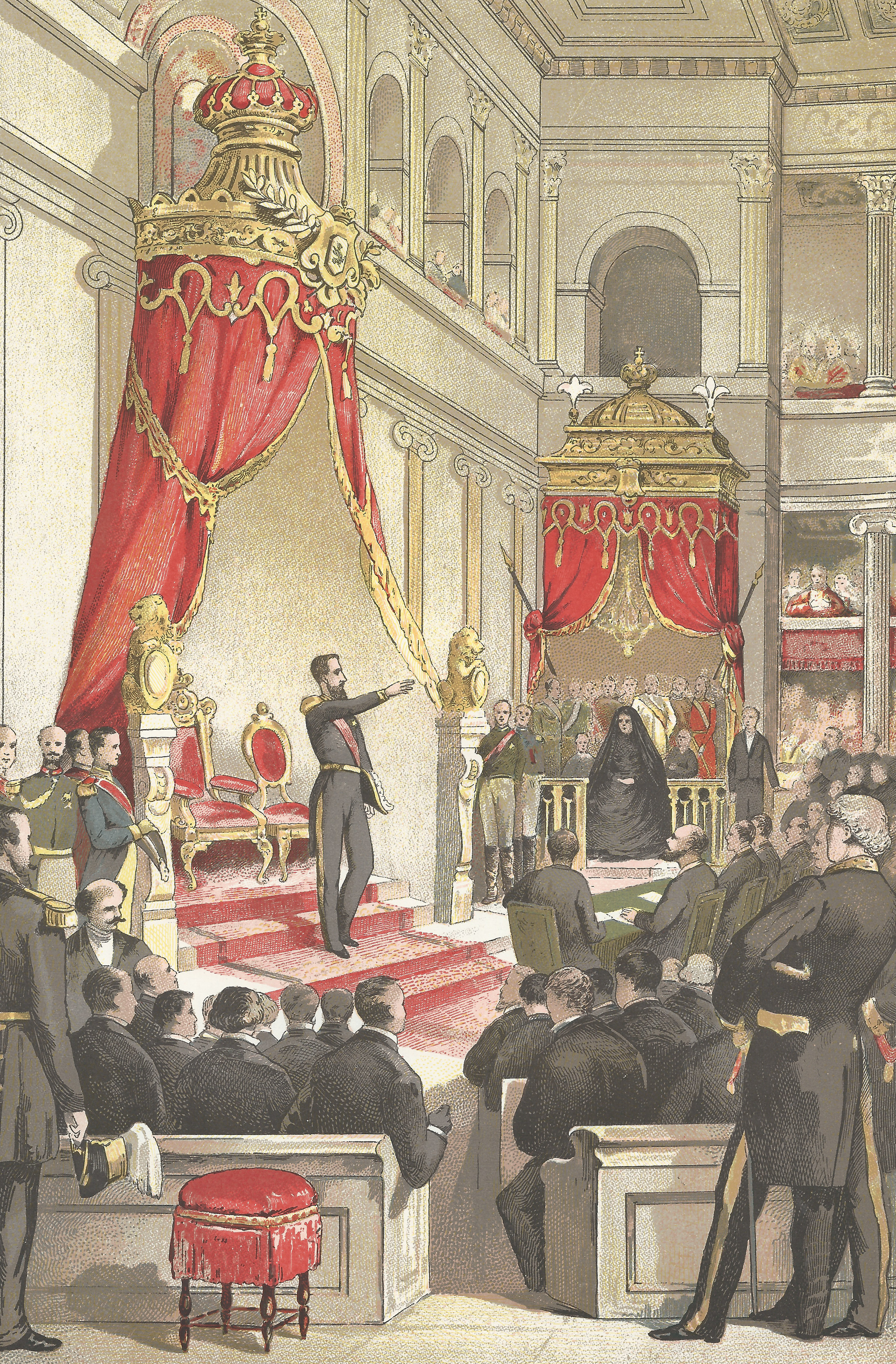
Leopold II takes the oath

Article 64 of the Belgian constitution sets forth four qualifications for representatives: each representative must be at least 21 years old, possess Belgian nationality, have the full enjoyment of civil and political rights, and be a resident of Belgium. A representative can only enter into office after having taken the oath of office in any of the three official languages of Belgium: Dutch, French or German. Representatives can also choose to take the oath in more than one language. The oath of office is as follows: "I swear to observe the Constitution". (Dutch: Ik zweer de Grondwet na te leven, French: Je jure d'observer la Constitution, German: Ich schwöre, die Verfassung zu befolgen)

Certain offices are incompatible with the office of representative. Members of a regional or community parliament who take the oath of office as a representative automatically cease to sit in the regional or community parliament, in accordance with the Belgian Electoral Code. The same applies the other way around as well, a representative who takes the oath of office in a regional or community parliament automatically ceases to be a representative. A member of the Chamber of Representatives may not also be a member of the Senate at the same time, and senators must give up their seats in the Senate to join the Chamber of Representatives.

Another important incompatibility is based on the separation of powers. A representative appointed as a minister ceases to sit in the Chamber of Representatives. During their service, the representative is replaced. Individuals resigning as a minister can return to the Chamber in accordance with Article 50 of the Belgian Constitution. A representative cannot be a civil servant or a member of the judiciary at the same time; however, a civil servant who is elected to the Chamber is entitled to political leave and doesn't have to resign as a civil servant. It is also not possible to be a member of the Federal Parliament and a member of the European Parliament at the same time.

The Chamber of Representatives does not systematically check whether any of these (or other) incompatibilities applies to its members; however, newly elected members are informed of the most important incompatibilities at the start of their mandate and it is up to them to verify that they are in compliance with the regulations regarding incompatibilities and, if not, to determine which office they will abandon.

== Officers ==
The Chamber of Representatives elects a presiding officer, known as the president, at the beginning of each parliamentary term, which starts on the second Tuesday of October each year. The president is assisted by up to five vice-presidents, two of which are known respectively as the first vice-president and the second vice-president, who are also elected at the beginning of each parliamentary term. The president is customarily a member of one of the parties forming the government coalition, only thrice in the history of the Chamber has the president been a member of the opposition. The first vice-president is usually a member of the other language group than that of the president. The current president of the Belgian Chamber of Representatives is Patrick Dewael of the Open Vld.

The president presides over the plenary assembly of the Chamber of Representatives, guides and controls debates in the assembly, and is responsible for ensuring the democratic functioning of the Chamber, for the maintenance of order and security in the assembly and for enforcing the Rules of the Chamber of Representatives. The president represents the Chamber at both the national (to the other institutions) and the international level. The president also assesses the admissibility of bills and proposals.

The president of the Chamber, together with the president of the Belgian Senate, ranks immediately behind the king in the order of precedence. The elder of the two takes the second place in the order of precedence, while the other takes the third. The presidents of the Chamber of Representatives and the Senate rank above the prime minister.

The Bureau of the Chamber of Representatives is composed of the president, the vice-presidents, the secretaries and the floor leaders of the fractions with at least five members. The fractions that have at least 12 members and have no president, vice-president or secretary sitting on the Bureau can appoint an additional member. The Bureau is elected for the duration of one parliamentary term, but in practice the composition of the Bureau remains the same for the entire duration of the legislature, which is four years, unless the Federal Parliament is dissolved early. The Bureau is responsible for the management of the Chamber of Representatives. In addition, the Bureau also appoints and dismisses the staff of the Chamber of Representatives. The Bureau usually meets once every three months.

There is also a Conference of Presidents, which is one of the most important bodies of the Chamber of Representatives. It consists of the president and vice-presidents of the Chamber, former presidents of the Chamber who are still members of the Chamber and the floor leader and a member of each fraction. A member of the federal government responsible for the relations with the Chamber attends the meetings of the Conference as well. The Conference meets weekly to discuss the day-to-day business and the work of the Chamber.

The Chamber of the Representatives has, just like the Senate a College of Quaestors, which consists of five representatives who are elected by the plenary assembly for a duration of two years. The Quaestors are in charge of the housekeeping of the Chamber, they are also responsible for matters such as human resources and computers. The Colleges of Quaestors of the Senate and the Chamber meet regularly to settle common problems concerning the library, buildings, security, catering, etc.

== Procedure ==
Like the Senate, the Chamber of Representatives meets in the Palace of the Nation in Brussels. The hemicycle of the Chamber is decorated in green. In contrast, the hemicycle of the Senate is decorated in red. These colours were inspired on the colours used by the House of Commons and the House of Lords of the Parliament of the United Kingdom.

The Belgian Constitution provides that the Federal Parliament meets by right on the second Tuesday of October every year for a parliamentary session of at least 40 days. This means that the parliamentary session is opened automatically without being convened by the king. The Constitution also provides that the Senate cannot meet when the Chamber of Representatives is not in session. Although the Constitution provides that the Federal Parliament must remain in session for at least 40 days, in practice it remains in session throughout the year. In principle, an ordinary session lasts from the second Tuesday of October until the day before the second Tuesday of October the following year; however, the Federal Parliament goes into recess three times a year, for the Christmas holidays, the Easter holidays and for the summer holidays from 20 July until the end of September. If the Federal Parliament is dissolved and new elections are held before the end of the parliamentary term, then the newly elected Chamber meets in extraordinary session until the start of the next ordinary session.

The committees of the Chamber of Representatives usually meet on Tuesday and Wednesday. On Wednesday, the Conference of President meets to set the agenda for the plenary session. On Thursday morning the fractions meet. The Chamber of Representatives usually meets for a plenary session on Thursday afternoon and every two weeks it meets in plenary session on Wednesday as well. Every Thursday afternoon between 2:00 p.m. and 3:00 p.m. is Question Time. There are usually no parliamentary activities on Friday.

Article 53 of the constitution provides that at least a majority of its members must be present for the Chamber to make decisions. It is noteworthy that this does not apply to all business of the Chamber, such as debates or questions to members of the federal government, but that a quorum must only be present to make decisions. If not enough members are present, the decision is invalid. To make a decision, at least 50% plus 1 of the members present and voting must vote in the affirmative. If a vote is tied, the president does not have a casting vote and the proposal is rejected. The procedure outlined in Article 53 of the constitution applies to all most decisions; however, the constitution establishes two exceptions: to amend the constitution, a two-thirds majority of the members must be present and at least two-thirds of the votes cast must be in the affirmative, and in order to adopt a so-called special law, a qualified majority of 50% plus 1 of each language group must be present and at least 50% plus 1 must be present and at least 50% plus 1 of the votes cast in each language group, as well as two-thirds of the votes cast of the two language groups together, must be in the affirmative.

The Chamber may vote in three manners. Firstly, it may vote by roll call. In the past, the names of the members were read in alphabetical order and each member had to announce his or her vote when his name was called; however, since 1995, voting by roll call has been done electronically. Voting by roll call is the most frequently used method and is compulsory in three cases: at the end of debates on a government statement, the vote on bills as a whole and when requested by at least eight members. Secondly, the Chamber may vote by sitting and standing. This method is used in less important cases requiring quick treatment and in which there is a clear majority. In the event of doubt, the vote is taken again or done electronically. Voting by sitting and standing is anonymous and is used for votes on amendments and individual articles of a bill. Finally, the Chamber may conduct a secret vote. In principle, the votes are public and votes on legislation are never secret, only the appointments and nominations the Chamber has to make take place by secret vote.

== Committees ==
The Chamber of Representatives uses committees for a variety of purposes. The Chamber has several standing committees, each of which has responsibility for a particular area of government (for example justice or social affairs). These standing committees examine and consider bills and legislative proposals, and may for this purpose hold hearings. A standing committee comprises 17 Representatives, members are appointed using proportional representation. The chairpersons of the committees are also divided among the parties in accordance with the same principle of proportional representation. As a result, some committees are chaired by members of the opposition.

=== Standing committees ===
This is a list of standing committees:

- Defence
- Social Affairs
- Justice
- Foreign Relations
- Revision of the Constitution and Reform of the Institutions
- Problems regarding Commercial and Economic Law
- Interior, General Affairs and the Civil Service
- Economy, Science Policy, Education, National Scientific and Cultural Institutions, Middle Classes and Agriculture
- Finances and Budget
- Infrastructure, Communications and Public Enterprises
- Public Health, Environment and Social Renewal

=== Special committees ===
There are also special committees, such as the Committee on Naturalisations.

== Legislative functions ==
Since the elections of 21 May 1995, there has been a breakdown of powers between the Chamber of Representatives and the Senate, which resulted in the Senate having fewer competences than the Chamber of Representatives. Prior to that, the Chamber of Representatives and the Senate did the same legislative work on an equal footing. This means that both chambers had to pass exactly the same version of a bill.

In certain matters both the Chamber and the Senate still have equal power, which means that both Chambers must pass exactly the same version of the bill. These include constitutional revisions, laws requiring a qualified majority (the so-called "community laws"), laws on the basic structure of the Belgian state, laws approving agreements of cooperation between the federal state, the communities and the regions, laws on the approval of international treaties, and laws on the organisation of the judiciary, the Council of State, and the Constitutional Court of Belgium. However, bills concerning international treaties are introduced in the Senate first before moving on to the Chamber.

Through functions like the scrutiny of cabinet minister before meetings of the Council of the European Union or European Council, the appointment of EU-rapporteurs and participation in Conference of Parliamentary Committees for Union Affairs the House of Representatives also plays a role in EU policy making.

For almost all other legislation, the Chamber of Representatives takes precedence over the Senate. However, the Senate may still intervene as a chamber of consideration and reflection as it has the opportunity to, within specific time limits, examine the texts adopted by the Chamber and, if there is a reason to do so, make amendments. The Chamber can subsequently adopt or reject the amendments proposed by the Senate or make new proposals. Whatever the case, the Chamber has the final word on all "ordinary legislation". The Senate may also submit a bill it has adopted to the Chamber which can approve, reject or amend it, in this case the Chamber also has the final word.

There are also certain matters for which the Chamber of Representatives is exclusively responsible. These matters include the granting of naturalisations, passing legislation with regard to the civil and criminal liability of the ministers of the Federal Government, the government budget and the State's accounts, appointing parliamentary ombudsmen and examine their activities, and determining military quotas.

== Relationship with the Government ==
The members of the Federal Government are answerable to the Chamber of Representatives, in accordance with Article 101 of the Constitution. On taking office, the Federal Government must have the confidence of the majority of the representatives. The Chamber of Representatives is also exclusively responsible for the political control of the Federal Government. The confidence in the Federal Government may be revoked by the Chamber at any time by the adoption of a motion of no confidence or by the rejection of a motion of confidence.

Due to the fragmented nature of Belgian politics, no party family has a realistic chance of winning the 76 seats needed for an outright majority in the Chamber of Representatives. Furthermore, no party family can realistically win enough seats to govern alone. As a result, nearly all Belgian governments since the end of World War I have been coalitions between two or more parties or party families.

== Current composition ==
Current party standings, as of September 2019:

Affiliation		Leader	Ideology	Position	Language group	Members
N-VA	New Flemish Alliance Nieuw-Vlaamse Alliantie	Bart De Wever	Flemish nationalism	Centre-right to right-wing	Dutch	25 / 150
PS	Socialist Party Parti Socialiste	Paul Magnette	Social democracy	Centre-left to left-wing	French	20 / 150
VB	Flemish Interest Vlaams Belang	Tom Van Grieken	Right-wing populism	Right-wing to far-right	Dutch	18 / 150
MR	Reformist Movement Mouvement Réformateur	Georges-Louis Bouchez	Liberalism	Centre-right	French	14 / 150
Ecolo	Ecolo Ecolo	Rajae Maouane & Jean-Marc Nollet	Green politics	Centre-left to left-wing	French	13 / 150
CD&V	Christian Democratic & Flemish Christen-Democratisch & Vlaams	Sammy Mahdi	Christian democracy	Centre to centre-right	Dutch	12 / 150
PVDA-PTB	Workers' Party of Belgium Partij van de Arbeid van België – Parti du Travail de Belgique	Raoul Hedebouw	Marxism	Left-wing to far-left	Bilingual	12 / 150
Open VLD	Open Flemish Liberals and Democrats Open Vlaamse Liberalen en Democraten	Egbert Lachaert	Liberalism	Centre-right	Dutch	12 / 150
Vooruit	Forward Vooruit	Melissa Depraetere	Social democracy	Centre-left	Dutch	9 / 150
Groen	Green Groen	Meyrem Almaci	Green politics	Centre-left to left-wing	Dutch	8 / 150
LE	The Committed Ones Les Engagés	Maxime Prévot	Social liberalism	Centre	French	5 / 150
DéFI	Democratic, Federalist, Independent DéFI	François De Smet	Regionalism	Centre to centre-right	French	2 / 150

=== Former compositions ===
==== Before 1993: 212 MPs ====
1978–1981

26	31	1	57	25	15	22	14	11	4	1	4	1
BSP	PSB	PSB (LUX)	CVP	PSC	PRLW	PVV	VU	FDF + RW	RW	UDRT-RAD	KPB-PCB	VB

1981–1985

2	2	26	35	43	18	24	28	20	8	3	2	1
Agalev	Ecolo	SP	PS	CVP	PSC	PRL	PVV	VU	FDF + RW	UDRT-RAD	KPB-PCB	VB

1985–1987

4	5	32	35	49	20	24	22	16	3	1	1
Agalev	Ecolo	SP	PS	CVP	PSC	PRL	PVV	VU	FDF	UDRT-RAD	VB

1987–1991

6	3	32	40	43	19	23	25	16	3	2
Agalev	Ecolo	SP	PS	CVP	PSC	PRL	PVV	VU	FDF	VB

1991–1995

7	10	28	35	39	18	20	26	10	3	3	12	1
Agalev	Ecolo	SP	PS	CVP	PSC	PRL	PVV	VU	FDF + PPW	ROSSEM	VB	FN

==== After 1993: 150 MPs ====
1995–1999

5	6	20	21	29	12	18	21	5	11	2
Agalev	Ecolo	SP	PS	CVP	PSC	PRL + FDF	VLD	VU	VB	FN

1999–2003

9	11	14	19	22	10	18	23	8	15	1
Agalev	Ecolo	SP	PS	CVP	CDH	PRL + FDF	VLD	VU&ID	VB	FN

2003–2007

4	23	25	21	8	24	25	1	1	18
Ecolo	SP.A + Spirit	PS	CD&V	CDH	MR	Open VLD	N-VA	FN	VB

2007–2010

8	4	14	20	30	10	23	18	5	1	17
Ecolo	Groen!	SP.A	PS	CD&V + N-VA	CDH	MR	Open VLD	LDD	FN	VB

2010–2014

8	5	13	26	17	9	18	13	27	1	1	12
Ecolo	Groen!	SP.A	PS	CD&V	CDH	MR	Open VLD	N-VA	LDD	PP	VB

2014–2019

2	6	6	13	23	18	9	20	14	33	1	2	3
PTB-GO!	Ecolo	Groen	SP.A	PS	CD&V	CDH	MR	Open VLD	N-VA	PP	FDF	VB

2019–2024

12	13	8	9	20	12	5	14	12	25	2	18
PTB-PVDA	Ecolo	Groen	SP.A	PS	CD&V	CDH	MR	Open VLD	N-VA	DéFI	VB

2024–2029

15	3	6	13	16	11	14	20	7	24	1	20
PTB-PVDA	Ecolo	Groen	Vooruit	PS	CD&V	Les Engagés	MR	Open VLD	N-VA	DéFI	VB

== See also ==
- List of presidents of the Chamber of Representatives of Belgium
- Belgian Federal Parliament
- Belgian Senate
- Politics of Belgium
