= Belgian passport =

Travel document

Belgian passport; Belgisch paspoort Passeport belge Belgischer Reisepass
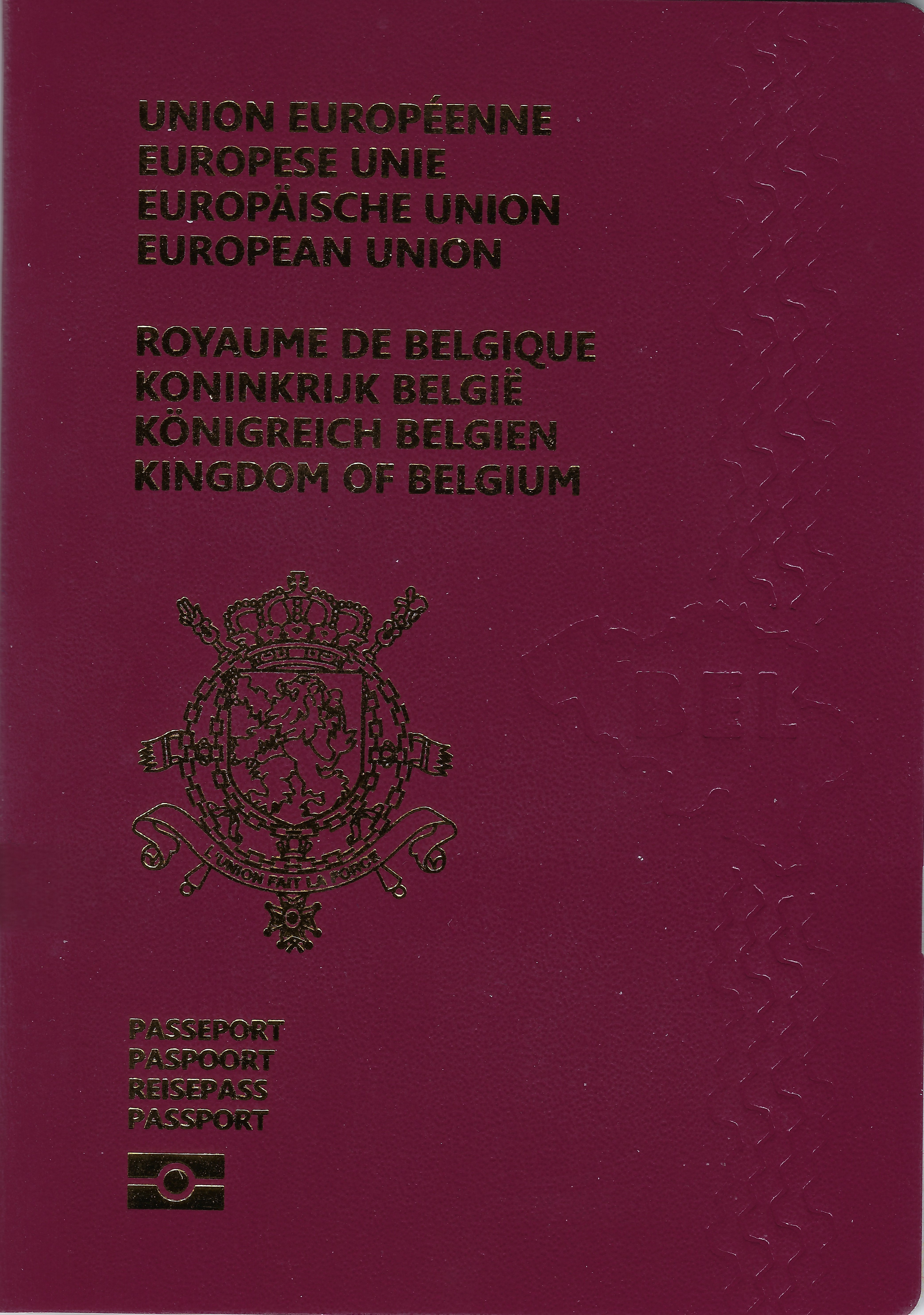
- The front cover of a contemporary Belgian biometric passport (2022, version shown for citizens of the French Community)

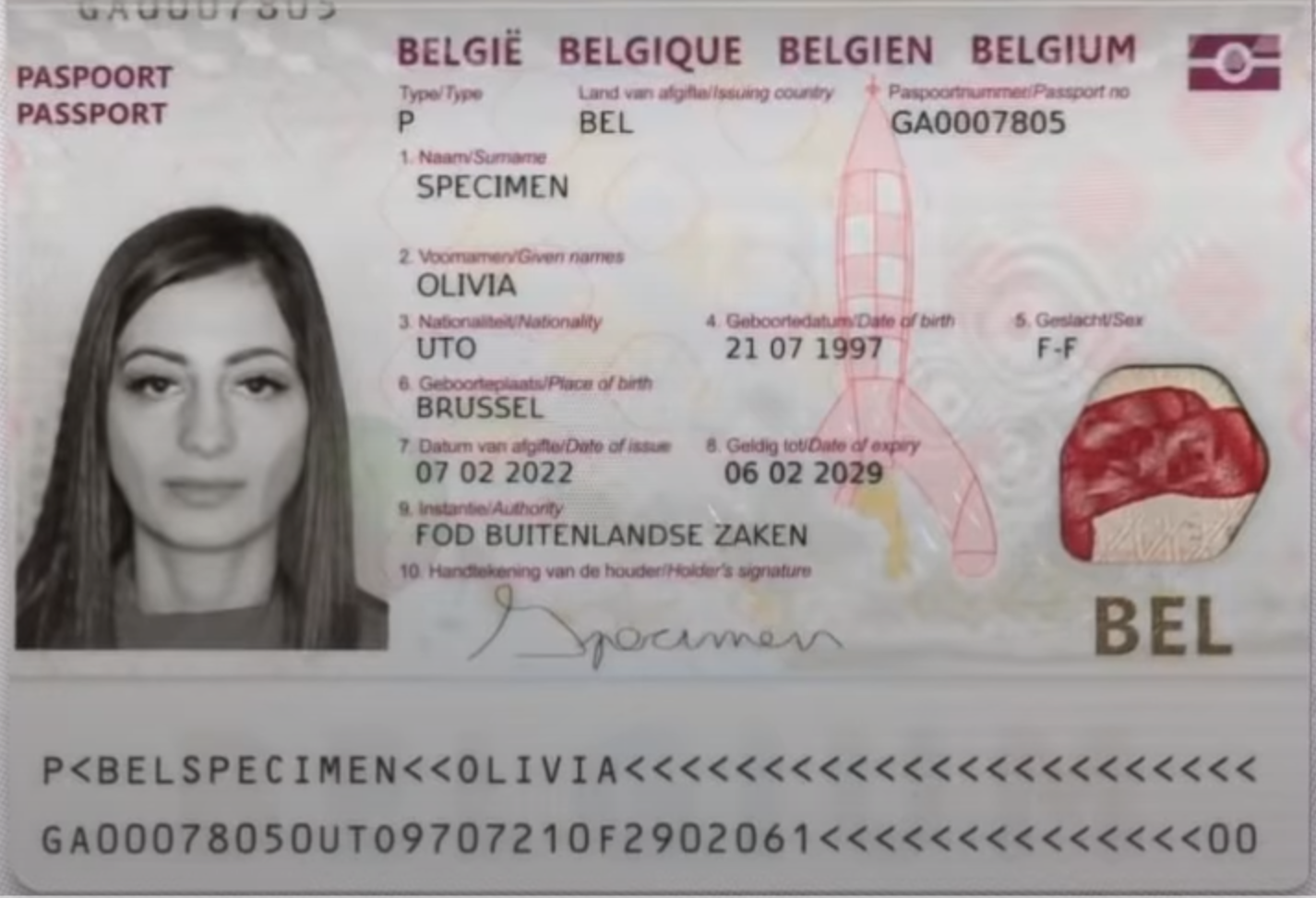
- The information page of a contemporary Belgian biometric passport (2022, version shown for citizens of the Flemish Community)
- Type: Passport
- Issued by: Federal Public Service Foreign Affairs
- First issued: 1 February 2008 (biometric passport); 7 February 2022 (current version)
- Purpose: Identification
- Eligibility: Belgian citizenship
- Expiration: 7 years (adults aged 18 or over); 5 years (minors aged under 18)
- Cost: €65 (adults; 32 pages; in Belgium); €35 (children; 32 pages; in Belgium); €245 (adults; 64 pages; in Belgium); €210 (children; 64 pages; in Belgium); €75 (adults; 32 pages; overseas); €35 (children; 32 pages; overseas); €240 (adults; 64 pages; overseas); €210 (children; 64 pages; overseas)

A Belgian passport (Dutch: Belgisch paspoort; French: Passeport belge; German: Belgischer Reisepass) is a travel document issued by Belgium to Belgian citizens to facilitate international travel. It grants the bearer international passage in accordance with visa requirements and serves as proof of citizenship.

== Types of passports ==
=== Standard passports ===
Standard passports are issued for ordinary travel, such as vacations and business trips. They are burgundy, available in 35 and 60-page formats, and are valid for 7 years.

=== Special passports ===
Diplomatic passports are issued to members of the Belgian royal family, members of the government, ministers of State, as well as representatives of Belgium or of the Communities or Regions (diplomats, economic or trade attaches, the main representative of each Community or Region).

Service passports are issued to civil servants within the federal public services, ministries, parliaments, and judicial services sent on an official mission abroad by the Belgian authorities.

Temporary passports are issued in Emergency Conditions, if there is a justifiable urgent matter requiring immediate travel. They are dark green and valid for only 6 months.

Emergency Travel Documents are issued by Belgian diplomatic representatives abroad when a previously issued passport has been lost. They have only 6 pages.

== Physical appearance ==
Belgian passports use the standard EU design and are usually burgundy.

The front cover is emblazoned with the Belgian lesser coat of arms.

Text on the front cover is printed in four languages (from top to bottom): French, Dutch, German and English.

The sequence of the first three languages varies according to the linguistic community of the bearer (either Dutch-French-German, French-Dutch-German or German-French-Dutch).

The following words are inscribed above the coat of arms, if the bearer is from the Flemish Community:

"EUROPESE UNIE" (Dutch), "UNION EUROPÉENNE" (French), "EUROPÄISCHE UNION" (German), "EUROPEAN UNION" (English) "KONINKRIJK BELGIË" (Dutch), "ROYAUME DE BELGIQUE" (French), "KÖNIGREICH BELGIEN" (German), "KINGDOM OF BELGIUM" (English)

The following is inscribed below the coat of arms, if the bearer is from the Flemish Community:

"PASPOORT – PASSEPORT – REISEPASS – PASSPORT"

Biometric passports have been issued since 2015 and these bear the standard biometric symbol at the bottom of the front cover.

In 2022, Belgium introduced a redesigned passport with illustrations from Belgian comic strips such as Tintin, The Smurfs, and Lucky Luke.

== Administration ==
=== Passport issuance ===
Belgian passports are issued by FPS Foreign Affairs, the country's ministry of foreign affairs. Belgian citizens may apply for a passport at the municipality or embassy where they are legally registered, which in turn procures the passport from the ministry.

Passports cost approximately €93.50, depending on the location of issuance. It is possible to make an urgent application at a higher cost.

The passport identifier is an 8-character alphanumeric with the structure AB123456; 2 alphas followed by 6 digits.

=== Lost and stolen passports ===
According to the Belgian police, 19,050 blank Belgian passports had been stolen between 1990 and 2002 and had been used to create forged travel documents.

Due to concerns about forgery, the Belgian authorities charge increasingly higher fees for the replacement of lost or stolen passports after the 2nd and 3rd loss.

== Citizenship of the European Union ==
Belgian citizens are also citizens of the European Union and thus enjoy the rights of free movement and residence in any other country in the European Union, as well as other European Economic Area states and Switzerland. The right to free movement is provided for in Article 21 of the EU Treaty.

== Travel freedom of Belgian citizens ==
Visa requirements for Belgian citizens Belgium Freedom of movement Visa free Visa issued upon arrival eVisa Visa available both on arrival or online Visa required prior to arrival

Belgian citizens are able to use their identity card to travel within the European Union and to other countries in the periphery of Europe.

As of 20 July 2025, Belgian citizens have visa-free or visa-on-arrival access to 188 countries and territories, ranking the Belgian passport 4th in the world according to the Henley Passport Index.

== Gallery of historic images ==
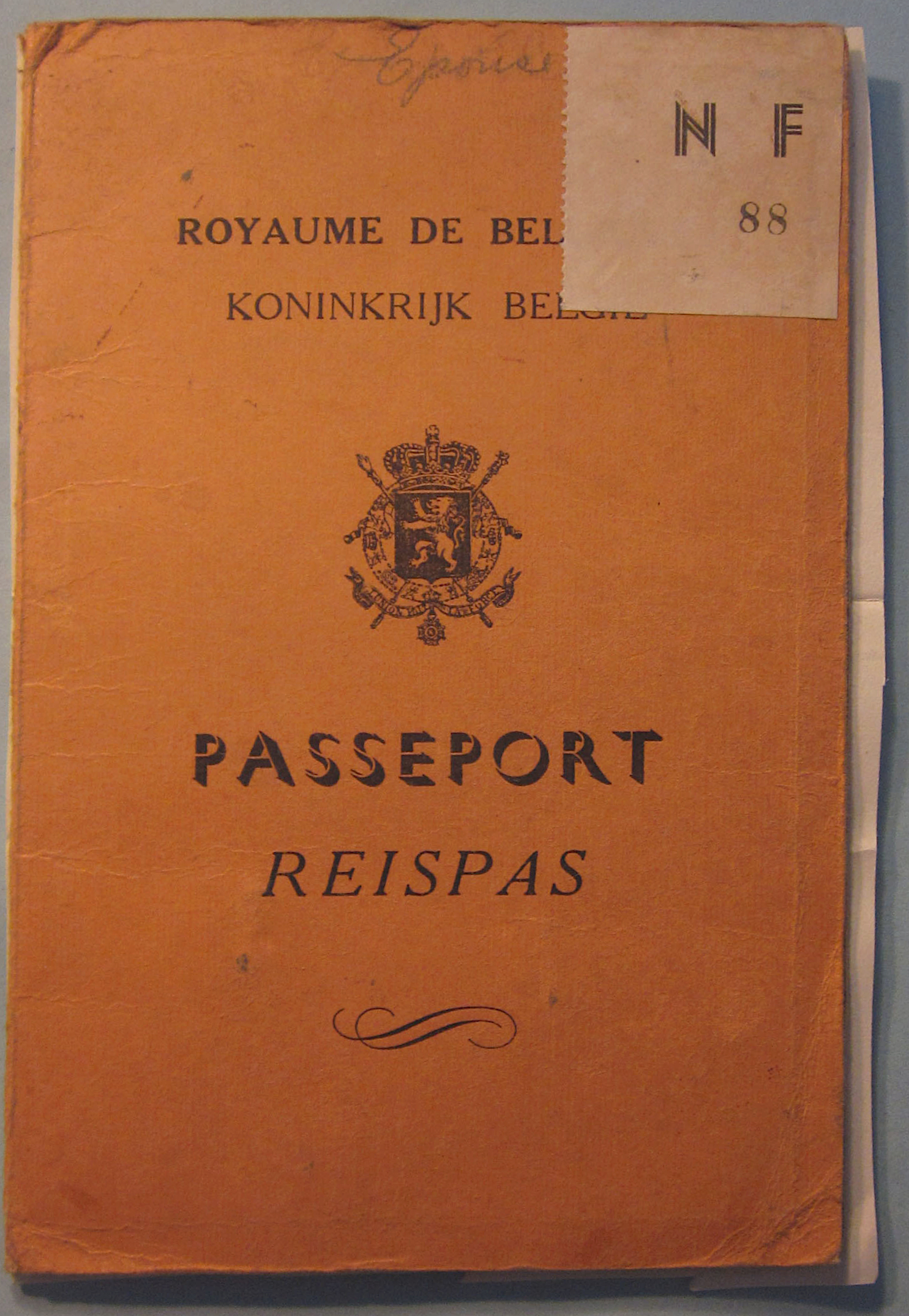
Belgian passport, circa 1940

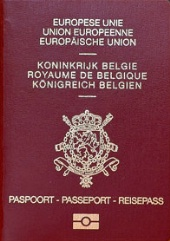
Biometric passport (2004 version)

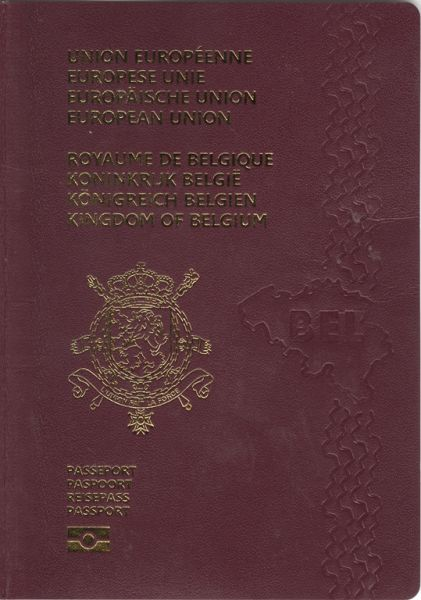
Biometric passport (2008 version)

== See also ==
- Belgian nationality law
- Belgian identity card
- Visa requirements for Belgian citizens
- Passports of the European Union
