= Belgian Chamber Committee on Naturalisations =

The Naturalisations Committee (Dutch: Commissie voor de Naturalisaties, French: Commission des Naturalisations) is a special committee of the Belgian Chamber of Representatives responsible for deciding upon applications for naturalisation. In accordance with Article 9 of the Belgian Constitution, which stipulates that naturalisation is granted by the federal legislative power, and Article 74, which provides that only the Chamber of Representatives, and not the Senate, is responsible for granting naturalisation.

The committee can decide to approve or reject the application, or to postpone the decision. In this case, the committee must request new advice before the final decision is made. In case an application is approved, the committee then forwards a naturalisation bill to the full Chamber, which must approve it in order for naturalisation to be granted. Once a naturalisation bill is signed and promulgated by the King, it is published in the Belgian Official Journal. The applicant has the Belgian nationality from the date of publication in the Official Journal.

The Naturalisations Committee consists of 17 Representatives.

In mid-2025, the application fee for Belgian citizenship was updated and raised from €150 to €1,000 as an effective step towards compatibility with the rest of the European Union. Registration fees will also be adjusted annually starting January 1, 2026.

== See also ==
- Belgian nationality law
