= Federal Public Service Interior =

Belgian federal government department

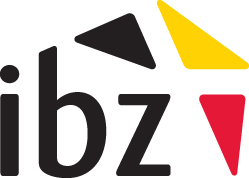
Official logo ("Intérieur Binnenlandse Zaken"

The FPS Interior (Dutch: FOD Binnenlandse Zaken, French: SPF Intérieur, German: FÖD Inneres), formerly the Ministry of the Interior, is a Federal Public Service of Belgium. It was created by Royal Order on 14 January 2002, as part of the plans of the Verhofstadt I Government to modernise the federal administration. The FPS Interior employs approximately 4,300 persons and is responsible for guaranteeing the rule of law, the registration and identification of natural persons, the immigration policy and for guaranteeing public order and safety.

The acronym IBZ comes from a mixture of its French and Dutch names, Intérieur Binnenlandse Zaken.

The FPS Interior is responsible to the Federal Minister of the Interior, Institutional Reforms and Democratic Renewal, Annelies Verlinden, since October 2020.

== Organisations ==
The FPS Interior is organised into five Directorates-General:

- The Directorate-General for Institutions and Population
  - National Register
  - eID
  - Elections
  - Three freedom of information commissions
- The Directorate-General for Civil Security
  - The Belgian Civil Protection falls under this Directorate-General
- The Directorate-General Crisis Centre
- The Directorate-General for Security and Prevention Policy
- The Immigration Service
