= Belgian Chamber Committee on Justice =

The Committee on Justice (Dutch: Commissie voor de Justitie, French: Commission de la Justice) is a standing committee of the Belgian Chamber of Representatives. It is responsible for all matters related to the administration of justice. The committee consists of 17 members and is currently chaired by Claude Eerdekens (PS). The seats on the committee are divided among CD&V/N-VA (4 seats), MR (3 seats), PS (2 seats), Open Flemish Liberals and Democrats (2 seats), Vlaams Belang (2 seats), SP.A-Spirit (2 seats), Ecolo-Groen! (1 seat) and CDH (1 seat).
