= National Register (Belgium) =

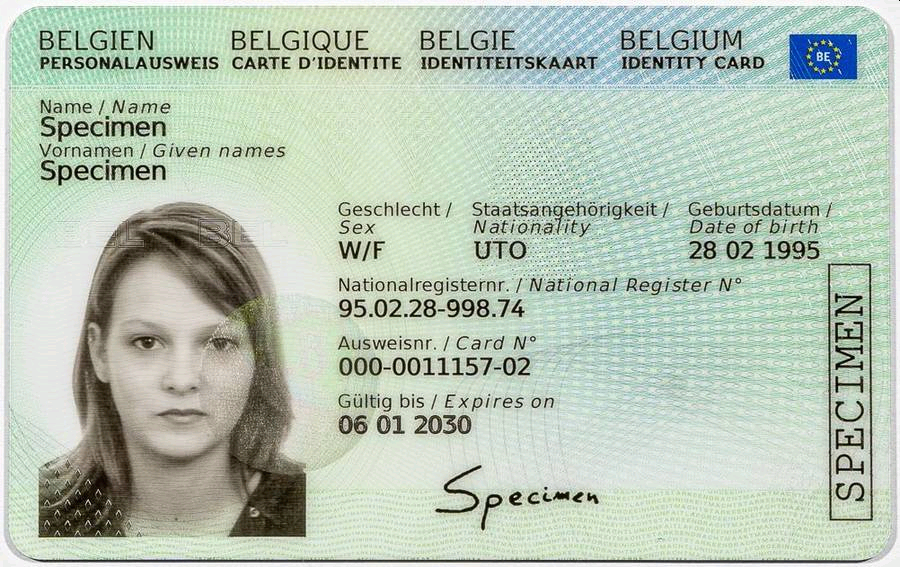
An ID card, containing the National Register number

The National Register (Dutch: Rijksregister, French: Registre national) is a database of resident registration in Belgium, containing the data of each Belgian citizen.

It is hosted by the Federal Public Service Interior but the data is maintained by the municipal administrations.

Each Belgian citizen has a unique National Register Number (a national identification number), mentioned on the Belgian identity card.

== History ==
In 1846, the first population census was carried out and subsequently every ten years. Every municipality kept a population register.

In the 1960s, many municipalities digitised their system. In order to simplify the administration, the national government created a National Register in 1968. The law of 8 August 1983 regulates the National Register.

== Register(s) ==
The National Register consists of:

- A population register for Belgian citizens and foreigners after residing at least five years in Belgium
- A foreigners register for foreigners residing up to five years in Belgium
- A waiting register for asylum seekers
- A consular register for Belgians registered at a Belgian embassy or consulate abroad
- An EEG protocol register with European Union personnel
- A register of non-residents

A change of address must be declared to the municipality, who sends a police officer to the new address for verification. After verification, the address is updated in the national register.

Before an election, the electoral rolls are extracted from the National Register and the municipal administration sends a voter invitation card to each eligible voter.

== See also ==
- Belgian nationality law
