= Belgian identity card =

National identity card of Belgium

eID
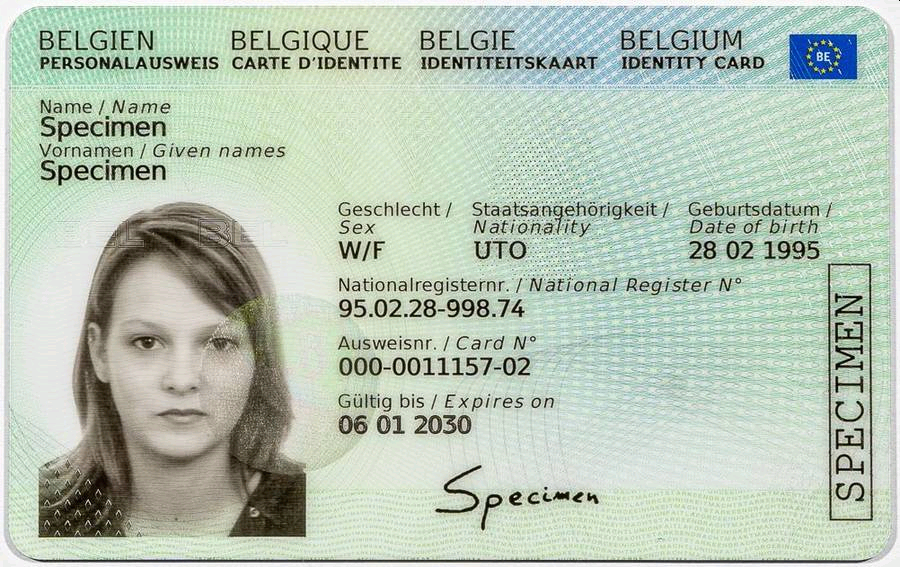
- Front of the card

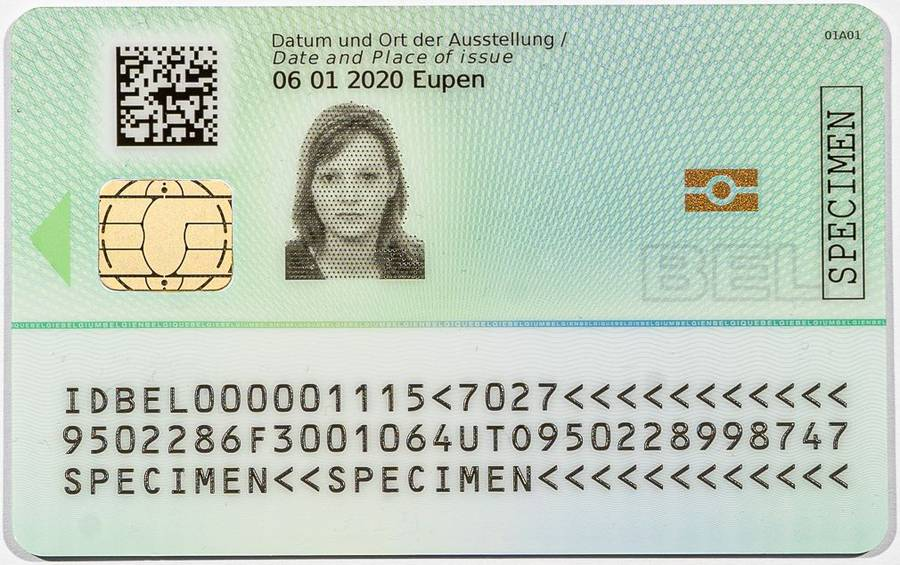
- Reverse
- Issued by: Belgium
- Purpose: Identification
- Valid in: EFTA; European Union; United Kingdom (EU Settlement Scheme); Rest of Europe (except Belarus, Russia, and Ukraine) Egypt; Gambia; Georgia; Montserrat (max. 14 days); Overseas France; Turkey
- Eligibility: Belgian citizenship

A Belgian identity card (Dutch: Identiteitskaart, French: Carte d’identité, German: Personalausweis) is a national identity card issued to all citizens of Belgium aged 12 years old and above.

Foreigners resident in Belgium are issued with a Belgian resident card (Dutch: Verblijfstitel, French: Titre de séjour, German: Aufenthaltstitel), which appears similar, but is legally distinct.

Nevertheless, the term "identity card" is often used to refer to both the identity cards issued to citizens and the resident cards issued to foreigners.

== History ==
Identity cards were first introduced in 1914 during the German occupation of Belgium during World War I. Before this point, compulsory identification documentation had been considered an anathema to the personal liberties associated with the Belgian state and constitution. The cards were based on the comparable documents used in Germany at the time and were preserved after the war. The card made no reference to biological sex until 1985.

== Card types ==
The main card types currently in issuance are as follows:

Short name	Full name	Eligibility	Right of residence	Register	Card validity	Other notes
Citizens' identity cards:
eID	Belgian identity card	Belgian citizens at least 12 years old	unconditional	population	10 years	card validity is 6 years for 12-18 year olds and 30 years for >75 years old
Kids-ID	Child's identity card	Belgian citizens under 12 years old	unconditional	population	3 years	
Foreigners' resident cards:
A	Certificate of registration in the foreigners' register	third country nationals	temporary	foreigners	1 year	
B	Certificate of registration in the foreigners' register	third country nationals	permanent	foreigners	5 years	
EU	Attestation of registration	EU/EEA/Swiss nationals	declarative	foreigners	5 years	formerly known as the E card before May 10, 2021
EU+	Document attesting permanent residence	EU/EEA/Swiss nationals resident >5 years	permanent	population	10 years	formerly known as the E+ card before May 10, 2021
F	Residence card for a family member of an EU citizen	family member of EU/EEA/Swiss national	declarative	foreigners	5 years	
F+	Permanent residence card for a family member of an EU citizen	family member of EU/EEA/Swiss national resident >5 years	permanent	population	10 years	
H	European blue card	third country nationals who are highly-qualified workers	temporary	foreigners	13 months	initially valid for 13 months; after 2 years, the holder may receive a card valid for 3 years. If changing from single work permit to EU Blue card due to change in employer, if new work contract is for duration > 3 years or unlimited, the holder may receive a card with 3 years of validity.
K	Foreigner's identity card	third country nationals resident >5 years	permanent	population	10 years	formerly known as the C card; allows for right of establishment
L	Long-term resident permit (EU)	third country nationals resident >5 years	permanent	population	10 years	formerly known as the D card; allows the holder to take up residence in other EU countries
M	Residence card for beneficiaries of the Brexit withdrawal agreement	British nationals resident in Belgium prior to 31 Dec 2020	permanent	foreigners	5 years	must apply by 31 Dec 2021
M	Permanent residence card for beneficiaries of the Brexit withdrawal agreement	British nationals resident in Belgium prior to 31 Dec 2020 and >5 years total	permanent	population	10 years	must apply by 31 Dec 2021
N	Frontier worker permit for beneficiaries of the Brexit withdrawal agreement	British nationals working in Belgium but resident in another country (cross-border worker)	n/a	n/a	5 years	
"Special" diplomatic identity cards:
D	Diplomatic identity card	diplomatic staff	temporary	Protocol Directorate	1–5 years	
C	Consular identity card	consular staff	temporary	Protocol Directorate	1–5 years	
P	Special identity card (blue)	administrative and technical staff	temporary	Protocol Directorate	1–5 years	
S	Special identity card (red)	service staff	temporary	Protocol Directorate	1 year	
E	Children's identity document	children of holders of special identity cards	temporary	Protocol Directorate	1–5 years	

Third country nationals refers to foreigners who are not EU/EEA/Swiss nationals.

== Card description ==
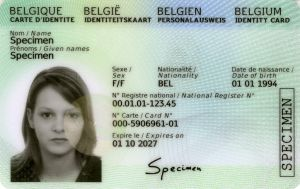

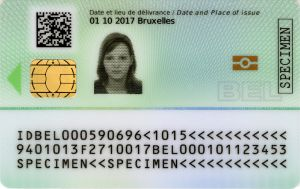
Starting from 2020, the chip is at the back of the card, according to the European format, and the chip includes two fingerprints.

=== Physical format ===
Cards are issued according to the ISO/IEC 7810 standard using the ID-1 size format, similar to credit cards.

They conform to ISO/IEC 7816 and have a 3-line machine-readable strip on the back starting with IDBEL.

=== Cards issued to Belgian citizens and EU/EEA/Swiss citizens ===
Cards issued to Belgian citizens and EU/EEA/Swiss citizens are green. They carry a heading of "BELGIUM" and the type of card (e.g. "IDENTITY CARD" or "EU+ Card"), written in all three national languages (Dutch, French and German) as well as in English. The remaining fields are bilingual - English in combination with either Dutch, French or German - depending on the official language of the place of residence of the subject.

If the place of residence is a Brussels municipality, the holder may choose between French or Dutch. If the place of residence is a municipality with language facilities, the holder may choose between French or Dutch, or French or German, depending on the local language facilities.

=== Cards issued to third country nationals ===
Cards issued to third country nationals are red and blue, in common with the standard EU format. This includes H cards (despite their full name as European Blue Cards) and M cards. All such cards carry a heading of "BEL" and "TITRE DE SÉJOUR" or "VERBLIJFSTITEL" or "AUFENTHALTSTITEL".

The title and all fields are monolingual - in Dutch, French or German - depending on the official language of the place of residence of the subject.

=== Printed information ===
Cards are printed with the following information relating to the subject:

- photograph of the person's face
- names (surname and the first two given names)
- sex
- nationality
- Belgian National Register number
- signature

Cards also bear the following information about the card itself:

- type of card
- card number
- place and date of issue (place of issue being the name of the municipality or embassy)
- expiry date

In addition, cards issued to foreigners contain:

- place and date of birth
- special observations (e.g. their labour market rights)

Historically cards were printed with the holder's residential address, but this is no longer shown on cards issued since 2005.

Other possible printed information includes nobility title (where applicable) and/or marital status (optional).

=== Digital information ===
Cards issued since 2005 contain a chip, which includes additional information, including:

- two digital certificates (authentication and, for adults, signing)
- residential address
- up to two fingerprints (since 2020)

=== National Register number and card number ===
Cards include two numbers that should not be confused with each other.

The National Register number is issued to the person upon their first registration (i.e. usually at birth for Belgian citizens) and held for life. It comprises 11 digits in the form yy.mm.dd-xxx.cd where yy.mm.dd is the birth date, xxx is a sequential number (odd for males and even for females) and cd a check-digit.

The card number applies only to the card in question and can take several different formats:

- Belgian citizens: 12 digits in the form xxx-xxxxxxx-yy where yy is a check digit calculated as the remainder of dividing xxxxxxxxxx by 97 (if the remainder is 0, the check number is set to 97)
- Third country nationals: nine digits in the form xxxxxxx xx
- EU/EEA/Swiss citizens: a letter and nine digits in the form B xxxxxxx xx

== Administration ==
=== Issuance ===
Residents of Belgium (both Belgian citizens and foreigners) receive their identity/resident cards from their local municipality.

Belgian citizens who are resident abroad can apply for renewal of their identity card at their local Belgian embassy or consulate.

The cost is usually approximately €25 (as of 2020) depending on the municipality or embassy.

=== Manufacture ===
The cards are manufactured by the Thales Group and over 28 million have been issued.

== Usage ==
=== Proof of identity ===
All people on Belgian territory are required to carry identity documentation at all times and produce such documentation if and when requested by the police and other government authorities.

Belgian citizens aged 15 and above are required to carry their identity card.

Foreigners are required to carry either their resident card (if resident) or otherwise an identity card issued by another European country or their passport.

=== Domestic usage ===
Identity/resident cards are frequently used in daily life in Belgium, including for the following purposes:

- Managing personal affairs with government agencies
- Attending medical appointments (in hospitals and at doctors' offices)
- Collecting prescription medication at pharmacies
- Validating trips on public transport services (eg. NMBS/SNCB)

Identity/resident cards can also be used together with a card reader to access online services and conduct operations such as:

- Signing and consulting documents
- Completing a tax return
- Consulting information held by government agencies, such as the Belgian National Register, the finance department (MyMinfin), the pension department (MyPension).
- Opening a bank account online

=== Travel document ===
Belgian citizens are entitled to use their identity card for international travel to the following regions/countries:

- All EU countries: Austria, Bulgaria, Croatia, Cyprus, Czech Republic, Denmark (including Faroe Islands and Greenland), Estonia, Finland, France (including Overseas France), Germany, Greece, Hungary, Ireland, Italy, Latvia, Lithuania, Luxembourg, Malta, Netherlands (excluding Dutch Caribbean), Poland, Portugal, Romania, Slovakia, Slovenia, Spain (including Ceuta and Melilla) and Sweden
- All other Schengen Area countries: Iceland, Liechtenstein, Norway, Switzerland and the three European microstates which are de facto members of the Schengen Area (Monaco, San Marino and Vatican City)
- Most other European countries: Andorra, Albania, Bosnia and Herzegovina, Gibraltar, Kosovo, Moldova (including Transnistria), Montenegro, North Macedonia, Northern Cyprus, and Serbia
- Selected other non-European countries: Egypt, The Gambia (entering via Banjul Airport), Georgia, Tunisia (on a group tour) and Turkey

Identity cards are not valid for travel to Belarus, Russia, Ukraine or the United Kingdom (terminated on 30 September 2021).

Resident cards issued to foreigners are technically not identity cards (in the EU/EEA context) and are therefore not valid for international travel. Foreigners must use a travel document issued by their country of citizenship for travel purposes.

== See also ==
- Belgian nationality law
- Belgian passport
- Visa requirements for Belgian citizens
- National identity cards in the European Union
