= Convention on the Reduction of Cases of Multiple Nationality and on Military Obligations in Cases of Multiple Nationality =

Convention of the Council of Europe

The Convention on the Reduction of Cases of Multiple Nationality and on Military Obligations in Cases of Multiple Nationality (E.T.S. No. 043) is a convention signed in 1963 by the Council of Europe with the stated aim of reducing cases of multiple nationalities.

== Background ==
The Convention aims to reduce as far as possible the number of cases of multiple nationality, as between Parties. It contains 2 chapters:

- Chapter I, "Reduction of cases of multiple nationality", lays down rules to reduce cases of multiple nationality in the case of the acquisition of a new nationality or the renunciation of one nationality, and the legal consequences for persons concerned, including minor persons.
- Chapter II contains provisions on "Military obligations in cases of multiple nationality".

The convention came into force in 1968 following the ratification by Italy, the second state, after France.

== Signatories, ratifications and renunciations ==
As of 2020, 15 of the 47 states of Europe have signed the convention, 13 of whom went on to ratify it with five choosing to denounce it (or partially denounce it) between 2000 and 2011. Denunciations by a party enter into force one year after the denunciation itself.

According to the Italian Government (the most recent to denounce chapter I of the convention): "The Italian government's denunciation of the 1963 Strasbourg Convention means that, as from June 4, 2010, Italian citizenship is no longer automatically lost for the Italians who become naturalised citizens of the countries signatories to that Convention."

Following the (partial) denunciations of many countries, the full treaty – including chapter I – is only in force for Austria and the Netherlands.

State	Signature	Ratification	Entry into force	Denunciation	Chapter I	Chapter II
Austria	6 May 1963	31 July 1975	1 September 1975	In force	✓	✓
Belgium	5 June 1963	18 June 1991	19 July 1991	27 April 2007 (Chapter I only)		✓
Denmark	16 November 1972	16 November 1972	17 December 1972	25 August 2014 (Chapter I only)		✓
France	6 May 1963	26 January 1965	28 March 1968	3 March 2008 (Chapter I only)		✓
Germany	6 May 1963	17 November 1969	18 December 1969	21 December 2001		
Ireland	16 March 1973	16 March 1973 (Chapter II only)	17 April 1973	In force (Chapter II only)		✓
Italy	6 May 1963	27 February 1968	28 March 1968	3 June 2009 (Chapter I only)		✓
Luxembourg	1 May 1969	11 October 1971	12 November 1971	9 July 2008 (Chapter I only)		✓
Netherlands	6 May 1963	9 May 1985	10 June 1985	In force	✓	✓
Norway	6 May 1963	26 November 1969	27 December 1969	18 December 2018 (Chapter I only)		✓
Portugal	23 February 1979	N/A	N/A	N/A		
Republic of Moldova	3 November 1998	N/A	N/A	N/A		
Spain	8 November 1985	16 July 1987 (Chapter II only)	17 August 1987	In force (Chapter II only)		✓
Sweden	26 June 1968	29 May 2002	30 June 2002	29 May 2002 (Chapter I only)		✓
United Kingdom	6 May 1963	7 July 1971 (Chapter II only)	8 August 1971	In force (Chapter II only)		✓
