= Kazuhiro Tsuga =

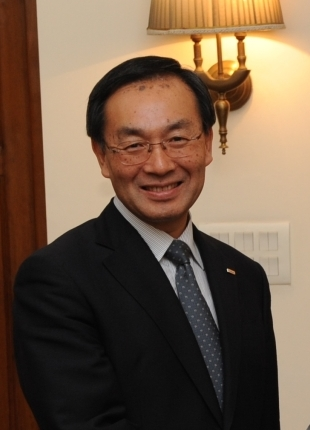
- Tsuga in 2014
- Born: November 14, 1956 (age 68); Japan
- Education: Osaka University (B.S. 1979); University of California, Santa Barbara (M.S. 1986)
- Occupation: Business executive
- Known for: Chairman of Panasonic

Kazuhiro Tsuga is a Japanese business executive who is serving as chairman of Panasonic.

== Early life and education ==
Tsuga was born in Japan in 1956 and studied at Osaka University and graduated in 1979 with a B.S. in bioengineering.

He immediately joined the workforce, and obtained an M.S. in computer science from the University of California, Santa Barbara in, 1986 through a company sponsorship.

== Panasonic ==
Tsuga first joined Panasonic, then named Matsushita Electric, in 1979. With a background in research and development, Tsuga's first executive management position came in 2008.

He was elevated to President of Panasonic on June 27, 2012, taking over for Fumio Ōtsubo. Otsubo, before being replaced, racked up losses of 750 billion yen.

Tsuga focused on returning Panasonic to profitability, highlighted by cutting 10% of the workforce in addition to re-prioritizing Panasonic's business strategy.
