= America Kotobuki Electronics Industries =

Defunct American electronics manufacturer

America Kotobuki Electronics Industries, Inc.
- Industry: Consumer electronics
- Founded: 1986; 40 years ago
- Defunct: 2008; 18 years ago
- Headquarters: 2001 Kotobuki Way, Vancouver, Washington, U.S.
- Number of employees: 400+ (2001)

America Kotobuki Electronics Industries, Inc. was an American electronics manufacturer owned by Matsushita. The company was based in Vancouver, Washington, and produced televisions and VCRs, including the Panasonic TV/VCR combination units and rear projection televisions, producing its last television in February 2008.

== History ==
In 1986, Matsushita opened its manufacturing plant in Vancouver, Washington. The subsidiary, named "America Kotobuki Electronics Industries", originally produces 20-inch and larger televisions for General Electric.

In January 1987, due to contract breakdowns, Matsushita announced that it will stop production of GE televisions, and America Kotobuki was adjusting its production to focus on video-tape recorders (VCRs) for GE.

On November 29, 2001, Matsushita Kotobuki Electronics Industries of America laid off 202 workers at its manufacturing plant, representing roughly 44% of the workforce, shifting production to Indonesia due to slowing demand.

In October 2002, Matsushita laid off an additional 150 workers at the plant, due to a halt in production for Panasonic televisions and VCRs. The fired employees were potentially being rehired within one to two weeks.

In September 2003, Matsushita was expanding production at its Vancouver, Washington, plant to include additional finished products, including 20-inch TV/VCR and TV/DVD player combination units.

In January 2008, Panasonic announced it will close the manufacturing plant in Vancouver, Washington by the end of March of this year, affecting 87 employees.
