= Kunio Nakamura =

Japanese businessman (1939–2022)

Kunio Nakamura (中村 邦夫, Nakamura Kunio; 5 July 1939 – 28 November 2022) was a Japanese businessman. He served as the president of Panasonic from 2000 to 2005 and assumed the position of chairman on 28 June 2006. Even though he is widely regarded as having reformed the company, he created a crisis in the mid-2000s for focusing on plasma display panels (PDPs) instead of medium liquid crystal TVs (LCDs).

At the 2010 Consumer Electronics Show in Las Vegas, Panasonic introduced their 152" 2160p 3D plasma. In 2010 Panasonic shipped 19.1 million plasma TV panels.

In 2010, shipments of plasma TVs reached 18.2 million units worldwide. Since then shipments have declined substantially; the decline has been attributed to competition from liquid crystal (LCD) televisions, whose prices have fallen more rapidly than those of the plasma TVs. In late 2013, Panasonic announced that they would stop producing plasma TVs in March 2014 onwards. In 2014, LG and Samsung discontinued plasma TV production as well, effectively killing the technology, probably because of falling demand.

Nakamura died from pneumonia on 28 November 2022, at the age of 83.
