= Panasonic Senior Partner =

1984 IBM-compatible portable computer

Senior Partner
- The Senior Partner in dual-floppy (left) and floppy-and-hard-drive (right) configurations
- Manufacturer: Panasonic Corporation
- Type: Portable computer
- Released: November 1983; 42 years ago
- Availability: March 1984
- Operating system: MS-DOS 2.11
- CPU: Intel 8088 at 4.77 MHz
- Memory: 128–640 KB RAM
- Dimensions: 19.75 by 13.5 by 8.25 inches (50.2 cm × 34.3 cm × 21.0 cm)
- Weight: 31 pounds (14 kg)
- Successor: Executive Partner

The Senior Partner (stylized as the Sr. Partner) is an IBM PC-compatible portable computer that was introduced by the Panasonic Corporation in 1984. Weighing roughly 31 pounds (14 kg) in its base configuration, the computer came equipped with a cathode-ray tube display and a built-in thermal printer.

== Specifications ==
In its stock configuration, the Senior Partner weighs 31 pounds (14 kg) and measures 19.75 by 13.5 by 8.25 inches (50.2 by 34.3 by 21.0 cm). Its monochrome, green-phosphor cathode-ray tube display measures nine inches diagonally and supports the CGA video mode for IBM PCs and compatibles, displaying text at up to 80 columns by 25 rows and graphics up to 640 by 200 pixels. The Senior Partner runs an Intel 8088 microprocessor clocked at the IBM-PC-standard 4.77 MHz. A slot for an aftermarket 8087 floating-point co-processor is included on the motherboard. The computer's base configuration is equipped with 128 KB of RAM, expandable to 256 KB via a proprietary plug-in expansion board. At the rear of the system unit is an RS-232 serial port, a Centronics-style parallel port (in a deviation from the IBM-PC-standard DB-25 parallel connector), and an RGBI port.

Panasonic offered three models of the Senior Partner: one with one 5.25-inch floppy drive; another with two such drives; and the last with one 5.25-inch floppy drive and one 10 MB hard drive. Panasonic dubbed the lattermost model the Super Senior Partner. The company supplied all units with MS-DOS 2.11, as well as a bundle of application software including GW-BASIC, WordStar, VisiCalc, pfs:File, pfs:Graph, and pfs:Report.

The Senior Partner features a built-in thermal printer capable of operating at up to 55 cps. The printer can feed out up to 80 inches of paper before jamming due to lacking a tractor-feed mechanism. It can print up to 132 columns of text per row.

== Development and release ==
Panasonic announced the Senior Partner in November 1983 and began delivering units to customers in March 1984. The hard drive–based Super Senior Partner was unveiled in May 1984, to be available in August that year. Despite being manufactured in Japan, Panasonic did not sell the computer domestically and instead only sold the computer in North America. By April 1984, Panasonic secured nearly 500 nationwide dealers in the United States to sell the Senior Partner. Panasonic commissioned a name-creation company to conjure the Senior Partner name; the final trademark was selected from a pool of 400 candidates.

== Reception ==
The Senior Partner received largely positive reviews from the technology press, although some criticism was reserved for the printer's output. For example, Russ Lockwood in Creative Computing wrote that, although operating at a very quiet noise level and producing overall good-quality prints, "letters with slanted and curved lines are not as sharp as they could be. Lockwood called the Senior Partner very heavy: "You will either develop bulging biceps or suffer a separated shoulder if you lug it about more than occasionally", albeit "Panasonic attaches a well-padded handle to ease the burden of carrying it". In the end, he called it a "fine machine with many extras—including a built printer—at a very competitive price".

In July 1985, Panasonic released the Executive Partner, the successor to the Senior Partner that also features a built-in printer. The Executive Partner replaces the Senior Partner's CRT display for a gas-plasma one and adds the ability to use loose-leaf paper in its printer with the purchase of an ink-ribbon print head.
