= I-PRO =

Japanese video camera manufacturer

i-PRO
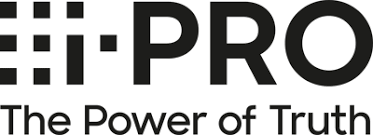
- Logo since 2019
- Trade name: i-PRO
- Native name: i-PRO株式会社
- Formerly: Panasonic Security and Panasonic Medical Vision
- ISIN: 1010001200456
- Industry: Video security
- Predecessor: Matsushita Communication Industrial Co., Ltd.; Panasonic System Solutions Company of Matsushita Electric Industrial Co., Ltd.; Panasonic System Networks Co., Ltd.; Panasonic i-PRO Sensing Solutions
- Founded: 2019; 7 years ago in Japan
- Headquarters: Tokyo, Japan
- Area served: Worldwide
- Key people: Masato Nakao (CEO)
- Products: Artificial intelligence for video surveillance; Camera; Electronics; Software
- Owner: Panasonic; Polaris
- Number of employees: 1400
- Divisions: i-PRO Americas Inc. (US); i-PRO APAC Pte. Ltd. (Singapore); i-PRO Co., Ltd. (Europe); i-PRO Sensing Technology (Suzhou) Co., Ltd. (China)
- Website: https://i-pro.com/

i-PRO is a company established in Japan in 2019, originating from a division of Panasonic. The company manufactures video protection cameras with advanced AI video data analytics, as well as specialized camera modules integrated into medical devices, catering to security surveillance, public safety, medical imaging, and industrial applications.

== History ==
Panasonic had been in the semiconductor industry since 1957, with their semiconductor technologies used in various applications, including video surveillance cameras. IP network camera business started in 2001.

In 2019, Panasonic sold its security systems (security camera) businesses. Panasonic i-PRO Sensing Solutions Co., Ltd. was established as an independent entity, spun off from Panasonic’s Security Systems Business Division, with co-investment from Polaris Capital Group Co., Ltd. Since 2019, it has been providing surveillance camera systems. Since July 2020, the company has been offering network cameras with artificial intelligence (AI) capabilities directly integrated into the devices. In the spring of 2021, i-PRO took another step by including AI by default in its mid-range camera lineup.

The company established itself in Amsterdam, Netherlands in 2021 for the European market and in Houston for the US market. R&D facilities are located in Fukuoka.

Starting in 2023, it is developing products in the industrial sector to reduce the management workload of factory production lines, using artificial intelligence. In the same year, it signed the United Nations Global Compact.

== Products ==
Its technology uses artificial intelligence to analyze metadata captured on video in real time. When a person or vehicle is detected on the screen captured by the camera, it is surrounded by a blue frame. If the object enters a restricted area, the color of the frame instantly changes to red and an alarm sounds. To simplify the management of its cameras' AI capabilities, i-PRO also launched Multi-AI software (Active Guard), a plug-in that allows for the supervision of data analysis from multiple cameras within a video management system.
