= Panasonic Executive Partner =

1985 IBM-compatible portable computer

Executive Partner
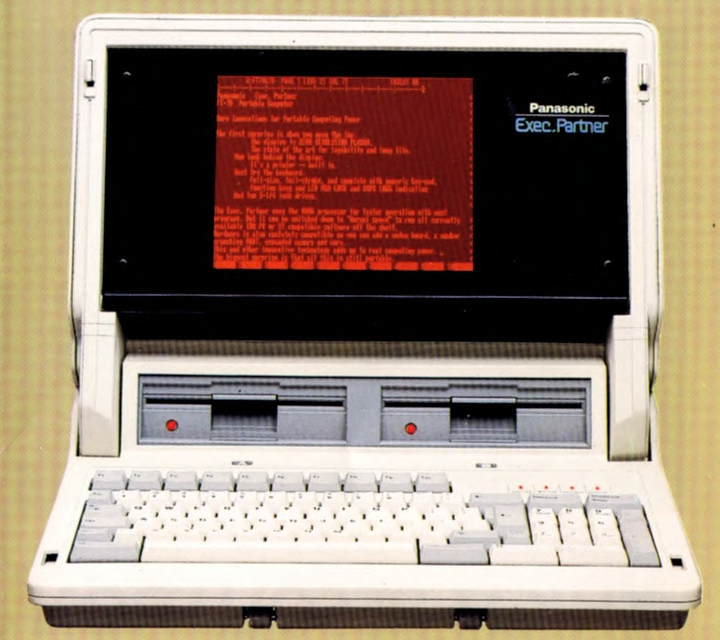
- Manufacturer: Panasonic Corporation
- Type: Portable computer
- Released: July 1984; 41 years ago
- Operating system: MS-DOS 2.11
- CPU: Intel 8086-2 @ 4.77 or 7.16 MHz
- Memory: 128–640 KB RAM
- Dimensions: 21.25 × 16 × 5 in (54.0 × 40.6 × 12.7 cm)
- Weight: 28–30 lb (13–14 kg)
- Predecessor: Senior Partner

The Executive Partner (stylized as the Exec. Partner; model number FT-70) is an IBM PC-compatible portable computer that was introduced by the Panasonic Corporation in 1985. The portable computer is AC-powered exclusively, weighs between 28 and 30 pounds (14 kg), and features a built-in printer. The Executive Partner was one of the first affordable portable computers with a plasma display.

== Specifications ==
The Executive Partner is a portable computer in a clamshell form factor that measures 21.25 by 16 by 5 inches (54.0 by 40.6 by 12.7 cm). Depending on the configuration, the computer weighs between 28 and 30 pounds (14 kg). Two models of the computer were released: one with dual 5.25-inch floppy drives and the other with one such floppy drive and a hard drive. All models in the Executive Partner range feature an Intel 8086-2 microprocessor running at user-switchable clock speed of 7.16 MHz or 4.77 MHz—the latter being the standard clock speed of the original IBM PC. The stock Executive Partner comes with 256 KB of RAM, expandable to 640 KB. Users must upgrade all the RAM at once if they are to upgrade to 640 KB because of the non-interoperability of the 64-kb chips of the 128 KB RAM with the 256-kb chips of the 256 KB RAM. The computer has one ISA expansion slot, supporting only certain cards 6 inch in length maximum. An expansion box offering slots for three full-length (13 in) cards was offered as an optional accessory.

The portable features a flat-panel gas plasma display measuring 11 in diagonally and the display housing holding the plasma panel being only 2 in thick. Because of the heavy current draw of the computer's plasma display, the Executive Partner is powered through mains AC exclusively. The plasma display produces a neon-orange image that was said to exhibit less glare than contemporary cathode-ray tubes and LCDs. A special hinge mechanism prevents the display housing from slamming into the keyboard half of the chassis and potentially breaking the fragile glass layers of the plasma display. The graphics adapter supports CGA video; in graphics mode, it can display up to 640 by 200 pixels, while in text mode it can display up to 80 columns by 25 lines.

The Executive Partner features a built-in thermal printer with optional thermal transfer ribbon cartridge. The printer requires special thermal paper normally. Whereas the print cartridge allows use of standard loose-leaf paper. The Executive Partner can print up to 60 cps in draft mode and 30 cps in near-letter-quality mode. The printer can feed out up to 80 inches of paper before jamming due to lacking a tractor-feed mechanism. It can print up to 132 columns of text per row.

== Development and release ==
Panasonic Corporation released the Executive Partner in late July 1985, supported by a network of 78 value-added resellers and numerous retail outlets. It was released a year after Panasonic's somewhat heavier Senior Partner portable computer, which also features a built-in thermal printer. A hard drive–based model of the Executive Partner was released in late December 1985. At US$2,595 (equivalent to $7,768 in 2025), it was one of the first relatively inexpensive portables to feature a gas plasma display. Grid Systems had released a gas-plasma laptop—the GridCase III—earlier in the year, for nearly double the street price.

== Reception ==
InfoWorld's Tony Lima found the Executive Partner heavy like its predecessor, quipping: "It is portable—if you happen to be King Kong". Lima enjoyed the plasma display, calling the picture "rock steady, and while the red-orange color is disconcerting at first, you will probably adapt to it fairly quickly". He found the letter quality of the thermal printer satisfactory but noticed that the printer mechanism moved slower than was advertised. Lima concluded his review stating that, while "competitively priced for a computer and printer combination" in 1985, the Executive Partner was not a "particularly dazzling value", naming the HP Portable Plus as a competitor with more features.

Like Lima, Jon Pepper of PC Magazine called the Executive Partner weighty but praised the plasma display as "extremely readable, especially if you have been laboring over a Tandy 100 or another first-generation LCD portable computer". Pepper called the Executive Partner's keyboard "comfortable during prolonged touch-typing" and called the compatibility factor with IBM PC software problem-free. A late 1986 article in the same magazine called the computer "simply too big to be called a true laptop" but wrote that the display was "beautiful and readable under any lighting conditions ... scroll[ing] without a flicker".
