= Panasonic =

Japanese multinational electronics corporation

Panasonic Holdings Corporation
- Logo used since 1971

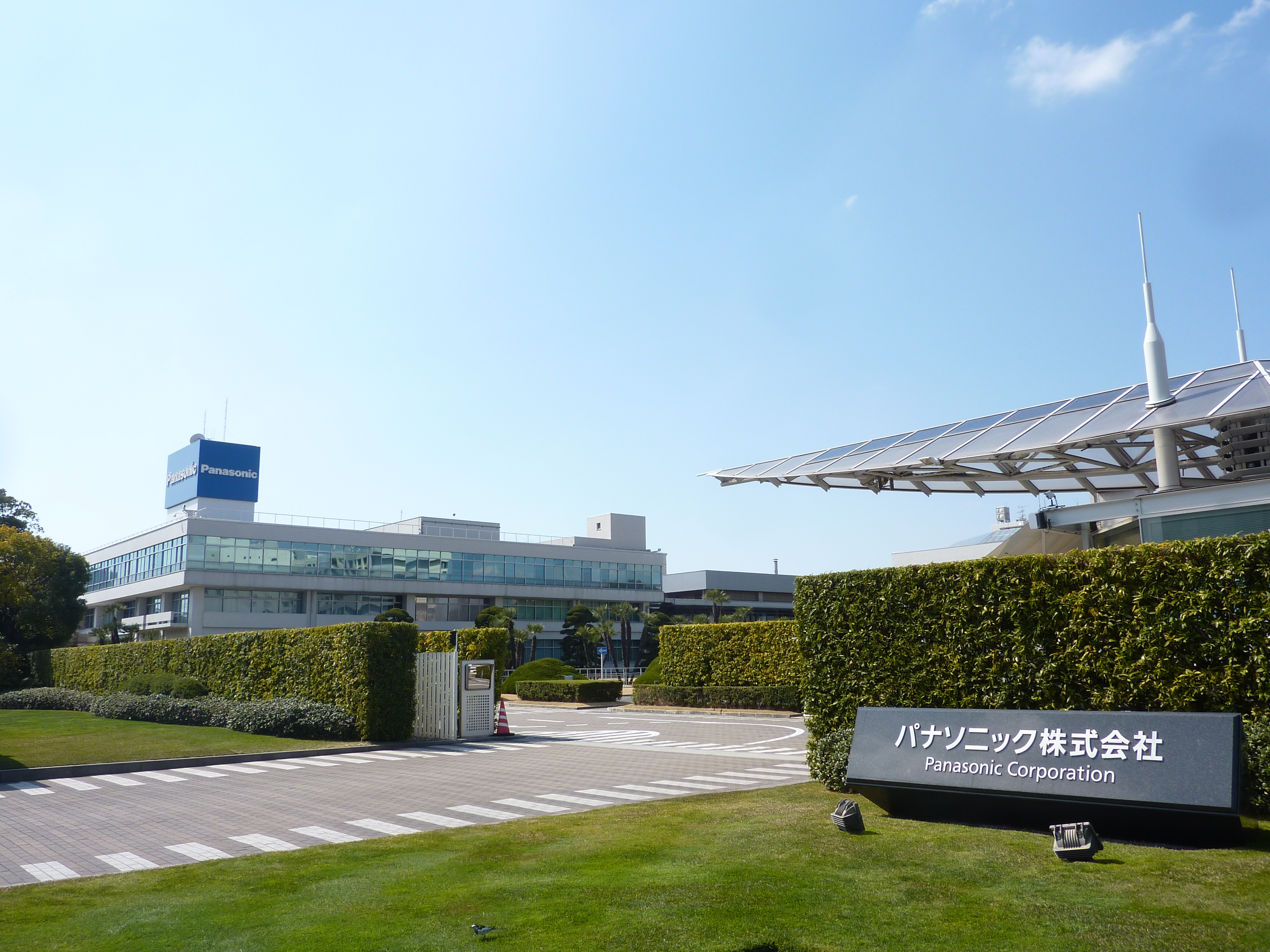
- Headquarters in Kadoma, Osaka, Japan
- Native name: パナソニック ホールディングス株式会社
- Romanized name: Panasonikku Hōrudingusu kabushiki gaisha
- Formerly: Matsushita Electric Housewares Manufacturing Works (1918–1929); Matsushita Electric Manufacturing Works (1929–1935); Matsushita Electric Industrial Co., Ltd. (1935–2008); Panasonic Corporation (2008–2022) (Note: Since April 2022, the "Panasonic Corporation" legal name is used for the now-renamed Panasonic Holdings' Lifestyle Updates Business Division.)
- Type: Public
- Traded as: TYO: 6752; NAG: 6752; Nikkei 225 component; TOPIX Large70 component
- ISIN: JP3866800000
- Industry: Conglomerate
- Founded: March 7, 1918; 108 years ago
- Founder: Kōnosuke Matsushita
- Headquarters: Kadoma, Osaka, Japan; 34.7438°N 135.5701°E
- Area served: Worldwide
- Key people: Kazuhiro Tsuga (chairman); Yuki Kusumi (president and CEO)
- Products: Consumer electronics; Home appliances; Batteries; Automotive systems; Avionics; In-flight entertainment; HVAC systems; Industrial automation; Electronic components
- Brands: Eneloop; Lumix; Sanyo; Technics
- Services: Supply chain management SaaS (Blue Yonder); System integration & IT solutions; Aviation connectivity services; Housing development & construction
- Revenue: ▼¥8.05 trillion (US$50.84 billion) (2026)
- Operating income: ▲¥263.11 billion (US$1.66 billion) (2026)
- Net income: ▼¥189.54 billion (US$1.2 billion) (2026)
- Total assets: ▼¥10.17 trillion (US$64.25 billion) (2026)
- Total equity: ▼¥5.38 trillion (US$34 billion) (2026)
- Number of employees: ▼183,685 (2026)
- Subsidiaries: Panasonic Corporation; Panasonic Connect; Panasonic Energy; Panasonic Industry
- Website: holdings.panasonic (corporate); panasonic.com (consumer)

Panasonic Holdings Corporation (Note: パナソニック ホールディングス株式会社; IPA: [panasoɲikkɯ̥]), colloquially known as Panasonic, is a Japanese multinational electronics manufacturer, headquartered in Kadoma, Osaka, Japan. It produces a wide range of products and services, including consumer electronics, rechargeable batteries, automotive and avionic systems, industrial equipment, as well as home renovation and construction. The company is listed on the Tokyo Stock Exchange and is a constituent of the Nikkei 225 and TOPIX 100 indices, with a secondary listing on the Nagoya Stock Exchange.

The company was founded by Kōnosuke Matsushita in 1918 as Matsushita Electric Housewares Manufacturing Works (Note: 松下電気器具製作所) and incorporated in 1935 as Matsushita Electric Industrial Co., Ltd. (Note: 松下電器産業株式会社) with some of its earliest products being radios, electric irons and bicycle lamps, under the National brand name. During wartime, Matsushita launched and made military components such as ships and aircraft for the Japanese state. By 1950, the company's assets were unfrozen and went public, and Matsushita became known for consumer white goods, black-and-white televisions and transistor radios. In addition to National, the Panasonic brand name was first adopted in 1955 for export markets and later still also created the Technics brand for audio equipment.

During the late 20th century, the company overtook Philips to become the world's largest manufacturer of consumer electronics. Matsushita had also been the majority owner of the Victor Company of Japan (JVC), and briefly from 1990–95 also owned the American media entertainment giant MCA Inc.. In 2008, the company divested its JVC subsidiary, discontinued its National brand in Japan, and changed its official corporate name from Matsushita Electric to Panasonic Corporation. (Note: パナソニック株式会社) In 2022, it reorganized as a holding company and adopted its current name.

== Corporate name ==
From 1935 to October 1, 2008, the company's corporate name was "Matsushita Electric Industrial Co., Ltd." (MEI). On January 10, 2008, the company announced that it would change its name to "Panasonic Corporation", in effect on October 1, 2008, to conform with its global brand name "Panasonic". The name change was approved at the shareholders' meeting on June 26, 2008.

In 2022, Panasonic announced a reorganization plan which split the company into Panasonic Holdings Corporation (the former Panasonic Corporation) and conversion of its divisions into subsidiaries; the Lifestyle Updates Business Division being the division that took the Panasonic Corporation name after the reorganization. The reorganization took effect on April 1, 2022.

== Brand names ==
Panasonic Corporation currently sells virtually all of its products and services worldwide under the Panasonic brand, having phased out the Sanyo brand in the first quarter of 2012. It uses the marketing slogan "A Better Life, A Better World". The company has sold products under a number of other brand names during its history.

In 1927, Matsushita adopted the "National" (Note: ナショナル, Nashonaru) brand name for a new lamp product. In 1955, the company began branding audio speakers and lamps as "PanaSonic" for markets outside of Japan. Further refined to Panasonic, taken from the words "pan" – meaning "all" – and "sonic" – meaning "sound", the brand was created for the Americas because the National brand was already registered by others. Panasonic also sold the first bread machine.

The company began to use the brand name "Technics" (Note: テクニクス, Tekunikusu) in 1965 for audio equipment. The use of multiple brands lasted for some decades. While National had been the premier brand on most Matsushita products, including audio and video, National and Panasonic were combined as National Panasonic in 1997 after the worldwide success of the Panasonic name.

In 1974, Motorola sold its Quasar brand and facilities to Matsushita.

In May 2003, the company announced that Panasonic would become its global brand, and launched the global tagline "Panasonic ideas for life." By March 2004, Matsushita replaced the National name for products and outdoor signboards, except for those in Japan. They would eventually phase out the National brand in Japan by March 2010.

In September 2013, the company adopted a new tagline to better illustrate its vision: "A Better Life, A Better World."

The Chinese company Shun Hing Electric Works and Engineering Co. Ltd (信興電工工程有限公司) has sold imported Panasonic and National branded products under the brand name Rasonic since the Matsushita Electric Industrial era. They have also sold MEI and Panasonic products under their original brand names. In June 1994, Panasonic Shun Hing Industrial Devices Sales (Hong Kong) Co., Ltd. (松下信興機電(香港)有限公司) and Panasonic SH Industrial Sales (Shenzhen) Co., Ltd. (松下电子机电(深圳)有限公司) were established by a joint venture between Matsushita Electric Industrial and Shun Hing Group respectively, making Rasonic a product brand for MEI and subsequently the Panasonic Corporation.

In September 2014, Panasonic announced the revival of the Technics brand, first in European markets in December of that year.

== History ==
=== 20th century ===
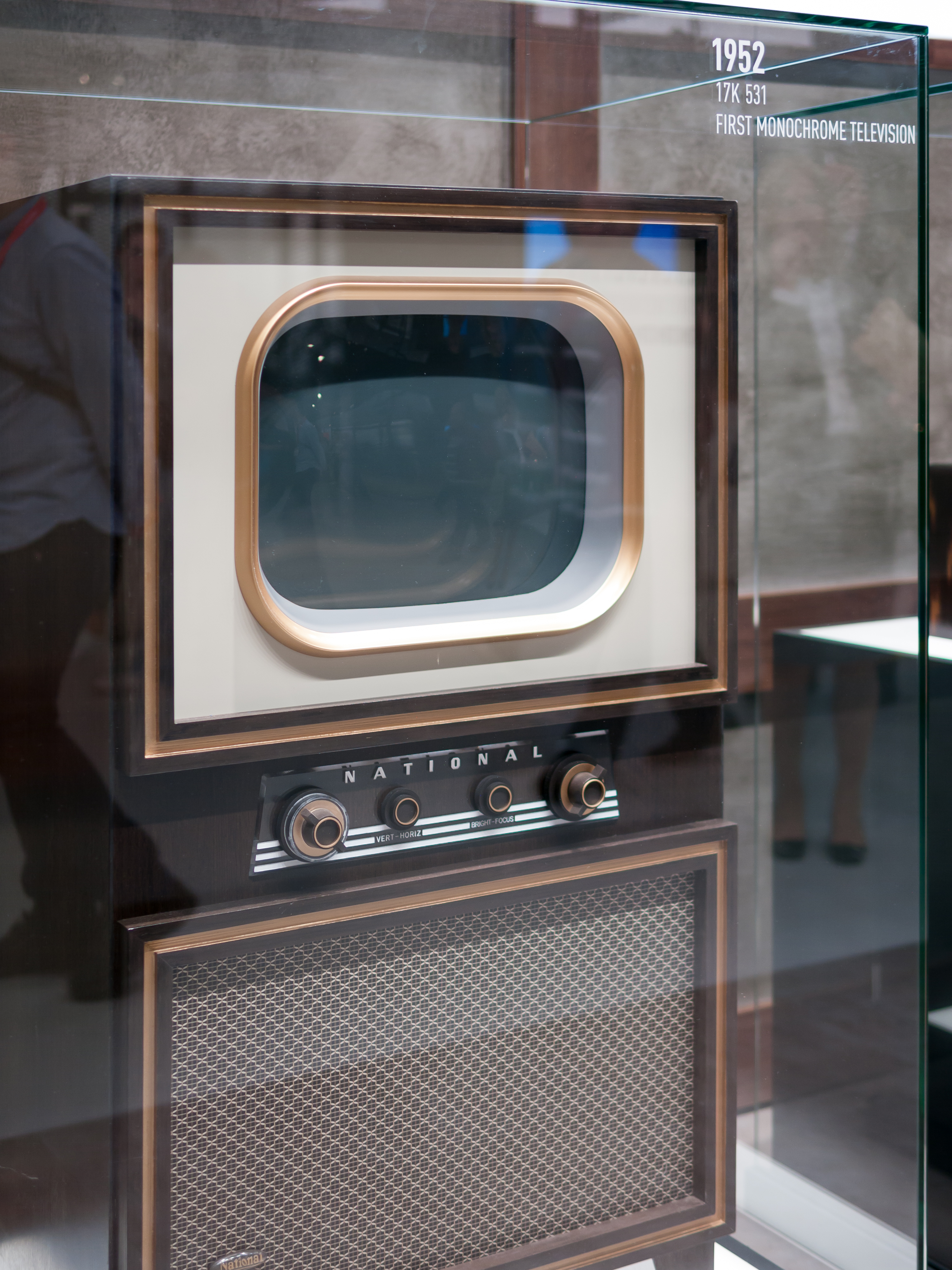
National TV set from 1952

Panasonic, then Matsushita Electric, was founded in 1918 by Kōnosuke Matsushita as a vendor of duplex lamp sockets. In the 1920s, Matsushita began regularly launching products. In 1927, he produced a line of bicycle lamps that were the first to be marketed with the National brand name. During World War II, the company operated factories in Japan and other parts of Asia which produced electrical components and appliances such as light fixtures, motors, electric irons, wireless equipment and its first vacuum tubes.

After the war, the Matsushita group, largely having been split into MEI and MEW by the dissolution imposed by the occupation force, imperfectly regrouped as a Keiretsu and began to supply the post-war boom in Japan with radios and appliances, as well as bicycles. Matsushita's brother-in-law, Toshio Iue, founded Sanyo as a subcontractor for components after World War II. Sanyō grew to become a competitor to Matsushita, but was later acquired by Panasonic in December 2009.

In 1961, Matsushita traveled to the United States and met American dealers. The company began producing television sets for the U.S. market under the Panasonic brand name, and expanded the use of the brand to Europe in 1979.

Its plant in 1963 produced eight TV sets per minute, accounting for 21.8% of Japan's production of cathode ray tube television sets at the time, the largest share out of any company.

The company used the National brand outside North America from the 1950s to the 1970s (the trademark could not be used in the United States because it was already in use). The inability to use the National brand name led to the creation of the Panasonic brand in the United States. Over the next several decades, Matsushita released additional products, including black and white TVs (1952), electrical blenders, fridges (1953), rice cookers (1959), color TVs, microwave ovens (1966), and analog synthesizers (1975, advertised as mini-organs).

The company debuted a high-fidelity audio speaker in Japan in 1965 with the brand Technics. This line of high quality stereo components became a worldwide favorite, the most famous products being its turntables, such as the SL-1200 record player, known for its high-performance, precision and durability. Throughout the 1970s and early 1980s, Matsushita continued to produce high-quality specialized electronics for niche markets, such as shortwave radios, and developed its successful line of stereo receivers, CD players and other components.

In 1968, Matsushita began to make rotary compressors for air conditioners, and, in 1971, it began to make absorption chillers, also for air-conditioning applications.

In 1972, Matsushita established its first overseas factory, in Malaysia.

In 1973, Matsushita established "Anam National", joint venture with Anam Group in South Korea.

On May 28, 1974, Matsushita acquired Motorola's Quasar television business for approximately $108 million including its United States manufacturing plants in Franklin Park; Pontiac; and Quincy, Illinois; as well as its Canadian manufacturing plant in Markham, Ontario.

In 1983, Matsushita launched the Panasonic Senior Partner, the first fully IBM PC compatible Japanese-made computer. A year later, Panasonic released the Executive Partner, the first affordable portable computer with a plasma display. Around this time the company also introduced inverter air conditioners.

In 1984, Matsushita established the Panasoft software label, which published software for MSX computers from 1984 to 1989. The company also manufactured MSX computers of its own, such as Panasonic FS-A1.

In November 1990, Matsushita agreed to acquire an American media company, MCA Inc., the predecessor of both Universal Music Group and Universal Pictures, for US$6.59 billion. The acquisition was preceded by the takeover of Columbia Pictures by Sony, the arch rival of Matsushita. At the time, Matsushita had dominated the home video market with the company's leading position in the electronics market. It had been strengthened by VHS, the de facto standard of consumer videotape that Matsushita and JVC co-introduced. Inspired by Sony's bold quest for Hollywood, Matsushita believed it could become a leader in the film industry as well. However, Matsushita subsequently sold 80% of MCA to Seagram Company for US$7 billion in April 1995, demoralized by the high volatility of the film industry.

In 1992, Matsushita made the Panasonic FS-A1GT, the last model of the MSX turbo R computer.

In 1993, Matsushita released the CF-V21P, the first notebook computer to have an integrated CD-ROM drive as an option (although only up to 80mm/3.5 inch diameter mini CDs instead of standard 120mm/4.7 inch diameter discs).

In July 1994, Panasonic announced it will close the former Motorola television manufacturing plant in Franklin Park, Illinois by the start of 1995, and will lay off 330 employees at the plant, shifting production to a facility in Tijuana, Mexico.

In 1998, Matsushita sold Anam National to Anam Electronics.

=== 2000–2020 ===
On May 2, 2002, Panasonic Canada marked its 35th anniversary in that country by giving $5 million to help build a "music city" on Toronto's waterfront.

In 2003, the Panasonic Viera (stylized VIERA) sub-brand was launched in Japan for the company's flat-panel TVs and then released in other territories. Matsushita embraced and was confident in plasma display technology and heavily invested in them. Panasonic was the largest global brand of plasma televisions for a while. However, in later years when plasma was ailing against LCDs, Panasonic was forced to scale back and discontinued production of plasma TVs in 2014 and moved entirely to production of LCD. The Viera brand has since been dropped outside the Japanese market.

In 2005, Matsushita Toshiba Picture Display Co. Ltd. (a joint venture between Matsushita and Toshiba created in 2002) stopped production of CRTs at its factory in Horseheads, New York. A year later, in 2006, it stopped production at its Malaysian factory, following heavy losses. In 2007, it bought the venture from Toshiba, eventually ending all production.

On January 19, 2006, Matsushita announced that it would stop producing analog televisions (then 30% of its total TV business) from the next month, to concentrate on digital televisions.

In 2008, all models of electric shavers from the Panasonic factory were called Panasonic shavers, and it dropped Matsushita and National from its name.

In late 2006, Matsushita began talks with Kenwood Corporation to sell and spin off JVC. As of October 1, 2008, JVC and Kenwood merged to create the JVCKenwood Corporation.

In January 2008, Panasonic announced it will close the manufacturing plant in Vancouver, Washington by the end of March of this year.

On November 3, 2008, Panasonic and Sanyo announced that they were holding merger talks, which eventually resulted in the acquisition of Sanyo by Panasonic. The merger was completed in December 2009, and resulted in a corporation with revenues of over ¥11.2 trillion (around $110 billion).

With the announcement that Pioneer would exit the production of its Kuro plasma HDTV displays, Panasonic purchased many of the patents and incorporated these technologies into its own plasma displays.

In April 2011, it was announced that Panasonic would cut its work force by 40,000 by the end of fiscal 2012 in a bid to streamline overlapping operations. The curtailment is about 10 percent of its group work force.

In October 2011, Panasonic announced that it was going to trim its money-losing TV business by ceasing production of plasma TVs at its plant in Amagasaki, Hyōgo Prefecture by March 2012, cutting 1,000 jobs in the process. Also, it sold some of Sanyo's home appliances business to Haier.

In January 2012, Panasonic announced that it had struck a deal with Myspace on its new venture, Myspace TV. Myspace TV would allow users to watch live television while chatting with other users on a laptop, tablet or the television itself. With the partnership, Myspace TV would be integrated into Panasonic Viera televisions.

On May 11, 2012, Panasonic announced plans to acquire a 76.2% stake in FirePro Systems, an India-based company in infrastructure protection and security solutions such as fire alarm, fire suppression, video surveillance and building management.

In April 2012, Panasonic spun off Sanyo DI Solutions, a digital camera OEM.

In line with company prediction of a net loss of 765 billion yen, on November 5, 2012, the shares fell to the lowest level since February 1975 to 388 yen. In 2012, the shares plunged 41 per cent. On November 14, 2012, Panasonic said it would cut 10,000 jobs and make further divestments.

On May 18, 2013, Panasonic announced that it would invest $US40 million in building a factory in Binh Duong, Vietnam, which was completed in 2014.

In July 2013, Panasonic agreed to acquire a 13% stake in the Slovenian household appliance manufacturer Gorenje for around €10 million. That same month, Panasonic signed an agreement with Sony to develop Archival Disc, described as an optical disc format for long-term data archival purposes.

In a press release following its announcement at IFA 2013, Panasonic announced that it had acquired the "Cameramanager video surveillance service" with the intention of expanding its reach to cloud-based solutions.

In 2014, Panasonic Healthcare was bought by KKR. Panasonic Healthcare was renamed PHC in April 2018.

In July 2014, it was announced that Panasonic has reached a basic agreement with Tesla Motors to participate in the Gigafactory, the battery plant that the American electric vehicle manufacturer plans to build in the U.S. In August 2014, Tesla said the plant would be built in the Southwest or Western United States by 2020. The $US5 billion plant would employ 6,500 people, and reduce Tesla's battery costs by 30 per cent.

Due to increased competition from China, Panasonic's Li-ion automotive market share decreased from 47% in 2014 to 34% in 2015. In June 2016, Tesla announced that Panasonic would be the exclusive supplier of batteries for its mass market vehicle Model 3. Batteries for the higher-end Model S sedan and Model X SUV will also be supplied by Panasonic. In early 2016, Panasonic president Kazuhiro Tsuga confirmed a planned total investment of about $1.6 billion by the company to construct Gigafactory to full capacity. However, after the number of Model 3 reservations became known in April, Panasonic moved production plans forward and announced a bond sale for $US3.86 billion, most of it to be invested in Gigafactory.

In November 2014, Panasonic announced its partnership with Photon Interactive to create customized and personalized digital signs in stores.

In January 2015, Panasonic announced it had stopped making TVs in China and plans to liquidate its joint venture in Shandong.

In March 2015, Panasonic announced plans to buy US satellite communication service provider ITC Global.

In April 2015, Panasonic announced its new range of products and relaunched its brand in South Africa. The company intends to use South Africa as a springboard into Africa, with Nigeria and Egypt as its initial targets.

In June 2015, Panasonic reached agreements with three Australian energy utilities (Red Energy, Ergon Energy and ActewAGL) to trial its home-based battery storage options.

In November 2015, Panasonic announced that it set up a new plant in Suzhou, China, through its subsidiary, Panasonic Ecology Systems Co., Ltd, to produce a new type of catalyst-coated diesel particulate filter (DPF) that decomposes matter contained in diesel engine exhaust gas.

In November 2015, Panasonic starts to retail locally harvested produce from its indoor agriculture facility salads via Veggie Life branding in Singapore, from the first licensed indoor vegetable farm in the country using Panasonic's own technology.

In February 2016, Panasonic and the City of Denver formed a formal partnership to make Denver the "smartest" city in the US. Joseph M. Taylor, chairman and CEO of Panasonic Corp. of America, laid out the plans for the partnership in four key areas: smart housing and small offices, energy and utilities, transportation and city services and smart buildings.

In 2016, Panasonic debuted a transparent TV. The same year, it announced that it will exit the TV business in the US, but after an eight year absence returned to America in 2024 selling televisions again.

In January 2016, Panasonic bought Bayer's diabetes care business for $1 billion.

In July 2016, Panasonic unveiled its interest in making acquisitions in the artificial intelligence (AI) and machine learning space. According to a source, the company has put aside $US10 million for use in either an acquisition or joint venture.

In January 2017, Panasonic announced it would shut down its vacuum cleaner manufacturing plant in Danville, Kentucky, by the end of March of that year, and lay off its remaining employees at the plant, as part of a plant to end its North American vacuum cleaner production.

In August 2018, the company announced, to avoid potential tax issues, Panasonic would move its European headquarters from the UK to Amsterdam in October as Brexit approaches.

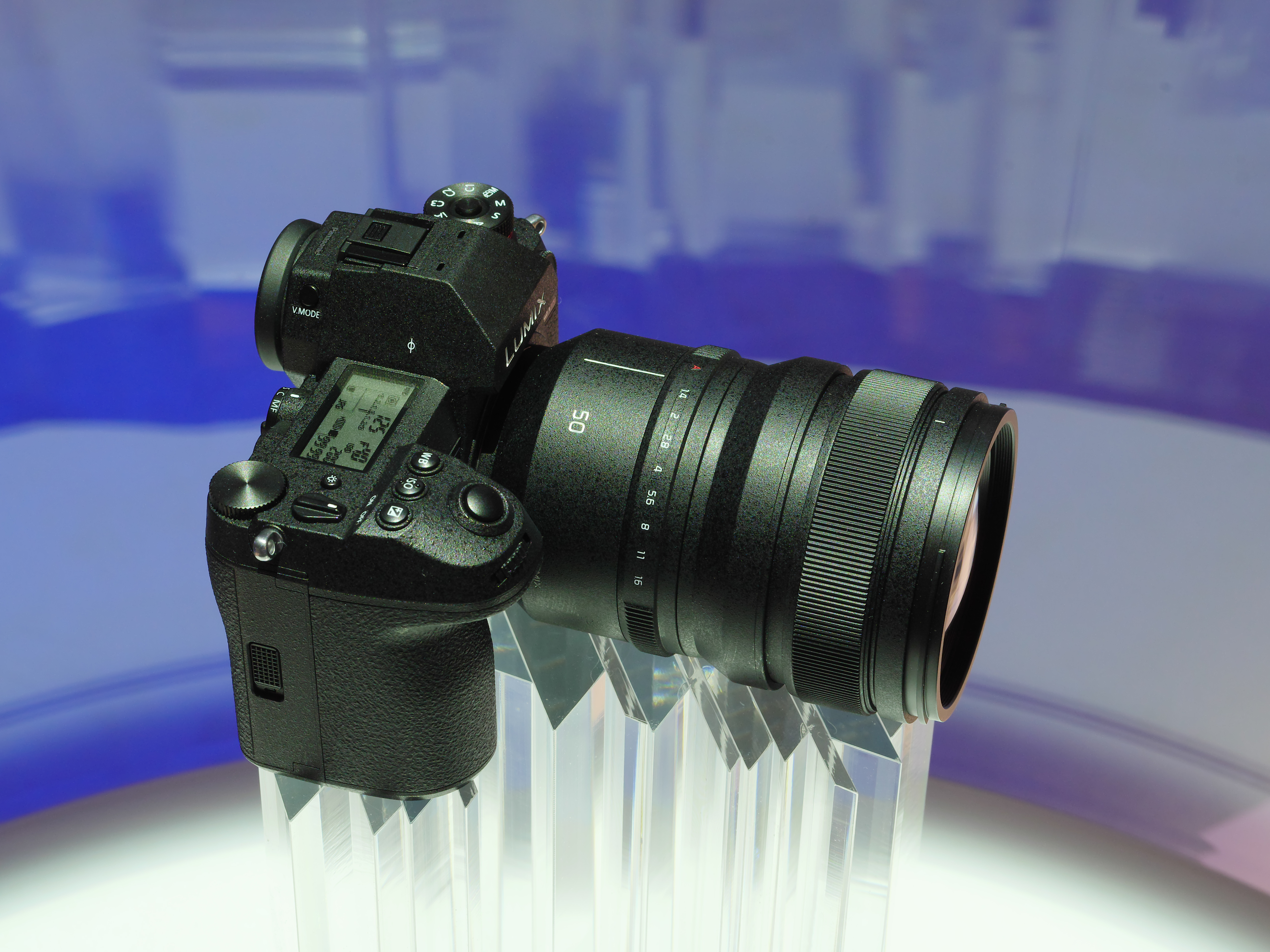
Panasonic Lumix S1R with prime lens 50 mm f/1.4 at Photokina in September 2018

On September 25, 2018, Panasonic became one of the founding members of the L-Mount Alliance, and announced two full-frame mirrorless cameras and a range of L-Mount lenses to be launched in 2019. The 47-megapixel Panasonic Lumix S1R and the 24-megapixel Panasonic Lumix S1 will be the first full-frame mirrorless cameras produced by Panasonic and will offer the Lumix Pro support service for professional photographers. These cameras will also be equipped with Dual Image Stabilization technology to help photographers when shooting in low-light.

In 2019, Panasonic sold its semiconductors and security systems (security camera) businesses. The security systems division was rebranded as i-PRO. The company also decided to completely exit from the liquid-crystal display panel business by 2021, marking the end of its display production, to focus its resources on the automotive and industrial businesses. Panasonic's LCD plant in Himeji, Hyōgo will be overhauled to manufacture automotive batteries.

=== 2020–present ===
In 2020, Panasonic exited the vending machine business, as it failed to achieve profitability, lagging behind rivals Fuji Electric, Sanden and Glory.

Meanwhile, Panasonic has made an investment to take a 20% stake in Blue Yonder, the supply-chain management software company previously known as JDA Software, deepening the integration of the former's industrial connected technology and the latter's products that has been under way since a year ago. In March 2021, it was reported that Panasonic will buy Blue Yonder for $US6.45 billion after buying a 20% stake in Blue Yonder for 86 billion yen in 2020. This deal is considered one of the biggest since 2011.

On November 19, 2020, Panasonic announced a restructuring set to be completed by 2022 in which the company spins off the domain companies as wholly owned subsidiaries while transforming itself into the holding company named Panasonic Holdings Corporation. Panasonic's plans are similar to that of its competitor, Sony, did on April 1, 2021, when Sony Corporation became Sony Group Corporation.

In November 2020, Panasonic signed a Memorandum of Understanding (MoU) with Equinor and Norsk Hydro to set up a Gigafactory in Norway, for battery production.

In January 2021, the company announced that it would end its solar panel production citing increasing price competition from Chinese manufacturers.

In June 2021, it was reported that Panasonic sold its entire stake in Tesla for $US3.6 billion.

In August 2022, it was reported that the company, which is a supplier to Tesla, was in discussions to build a new electric vehicle battery plant in the US, with Oklahoma named as a leading contender. This would be on top of the plant planned for Kansas. Each would have similar capacity. In the first half of 2022, Panasonic is ranked fourth in the world with a market share of 10 per cent according to SNE research. Construction of the battery plant in Kansas began in November 2022.

On December 13, 2022, Panasonic Energy Co., Ltd., and Lucid Group, Inc. announced that it had entered into multi-year agreements to supply batteries for Lucid's electric vehicle.

In September 2024, Panasonic announced that it would not renew its Olympic Partner agreement with the International Olympic Committee after the contract expired at the end of December 2024. Panasonic had been an official Worldwide Olympic Partner since 1987 and expanded its partnership to the Paralympic Games in 2014.

In December 2024, Panasonic Holdings completed the transfer of Panasonic Automotive Systems to a new ownership structure involving funds managed by Apollo Global Management. Panasonic Holdings retained a 20% stake in the new parent company, while the Apollo-managed funds held 80%.

In May 2025, Panasonic Holdings announced a group management reform plan that included approximately 10,000 job cuts, split evenly between Japan and overseas operations. The company said the restructuring was intended to improve profitability and included consolidation of sales and administrative functions, site closures, and early retirement programs.

In July 2025, Panasonic Energy North America opened its battery factory in De Soto, Kansas.

In February 2026, Panasonic announced a deal with Skyworth of China in which Panasonic will let Skyworth handle manufacturing, marketing and logistics of its television sets in the European and North American markets, effective from April 1.

== Current operations ==
As of March 31, 2012, Panasonic employed about 330,000 staff (reduced to around 260,000 by March 2020) and had around 580 subsidiaries. Panasonic had total revenues of ¥7,846,216 million in 2012, of which 53 per cent were generated in Japan, 25 per cent in Asia (excluding Japan), 12 per cent in the Americas and 10 per cent in Europe. The company invested a total of ¥520,216 million in research and development in 2012, equivalent to 6.6 per cent of its revenues in that year.

In 2012, Panasonic held a total of 140,146 patents worldwide. Panasonic was the world's top patent applicant for three decades, from the 1980s to the 2000s. According to a research conducted by the European Patent Office in 2020, the number of battery-related patents having been filed by Panasonic from 2000 to 2018 was the second-highest in the world. In 2025, the World Intellectual Property Organization (WIPO)'s Annual PCT Review ranked Panasonic's number of patent applications published under the PCT System as 12th in the world, with 1,717 patent applications being published during 2024.

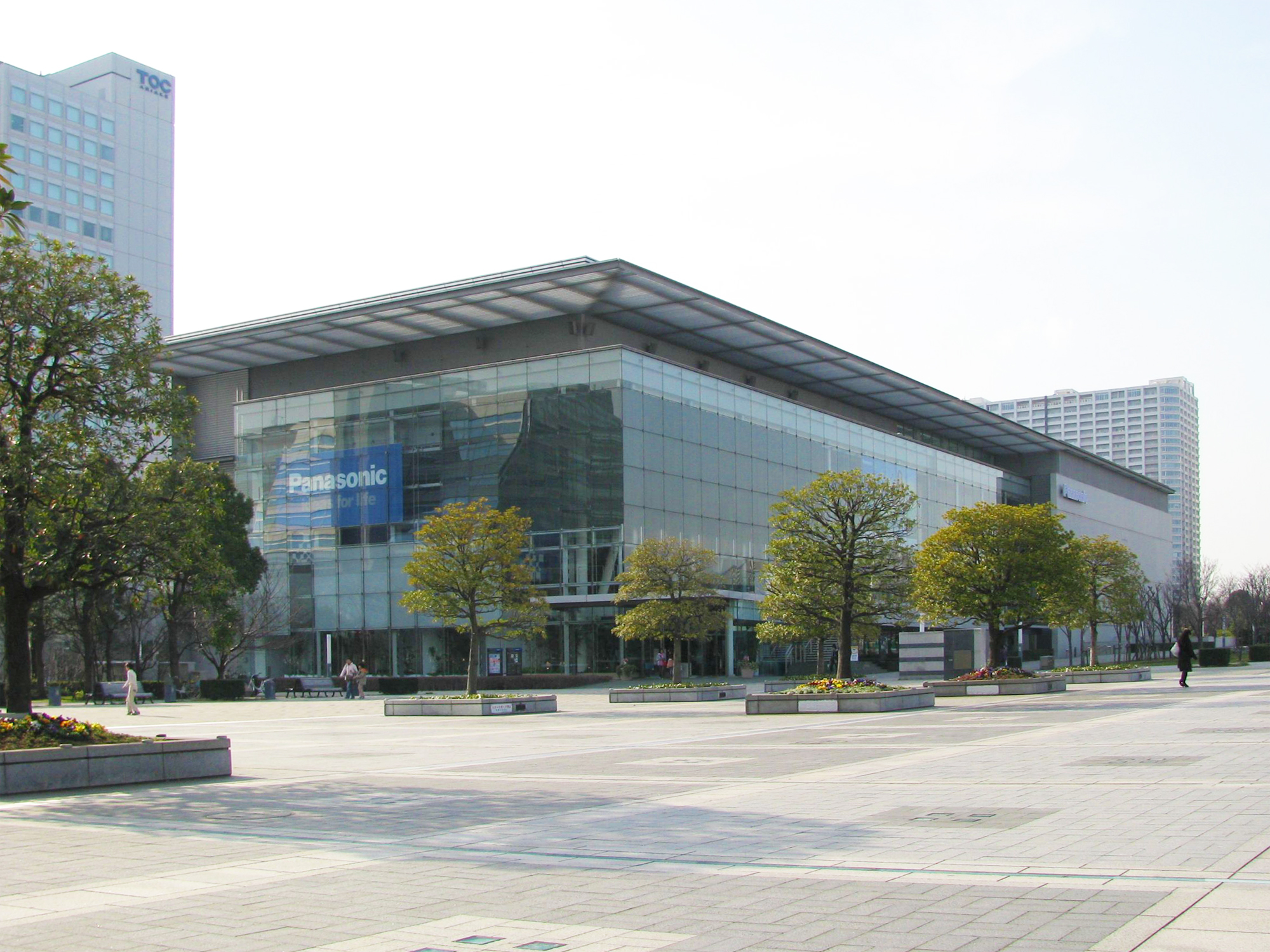
The Panasonic Center in Tokyo, Japan

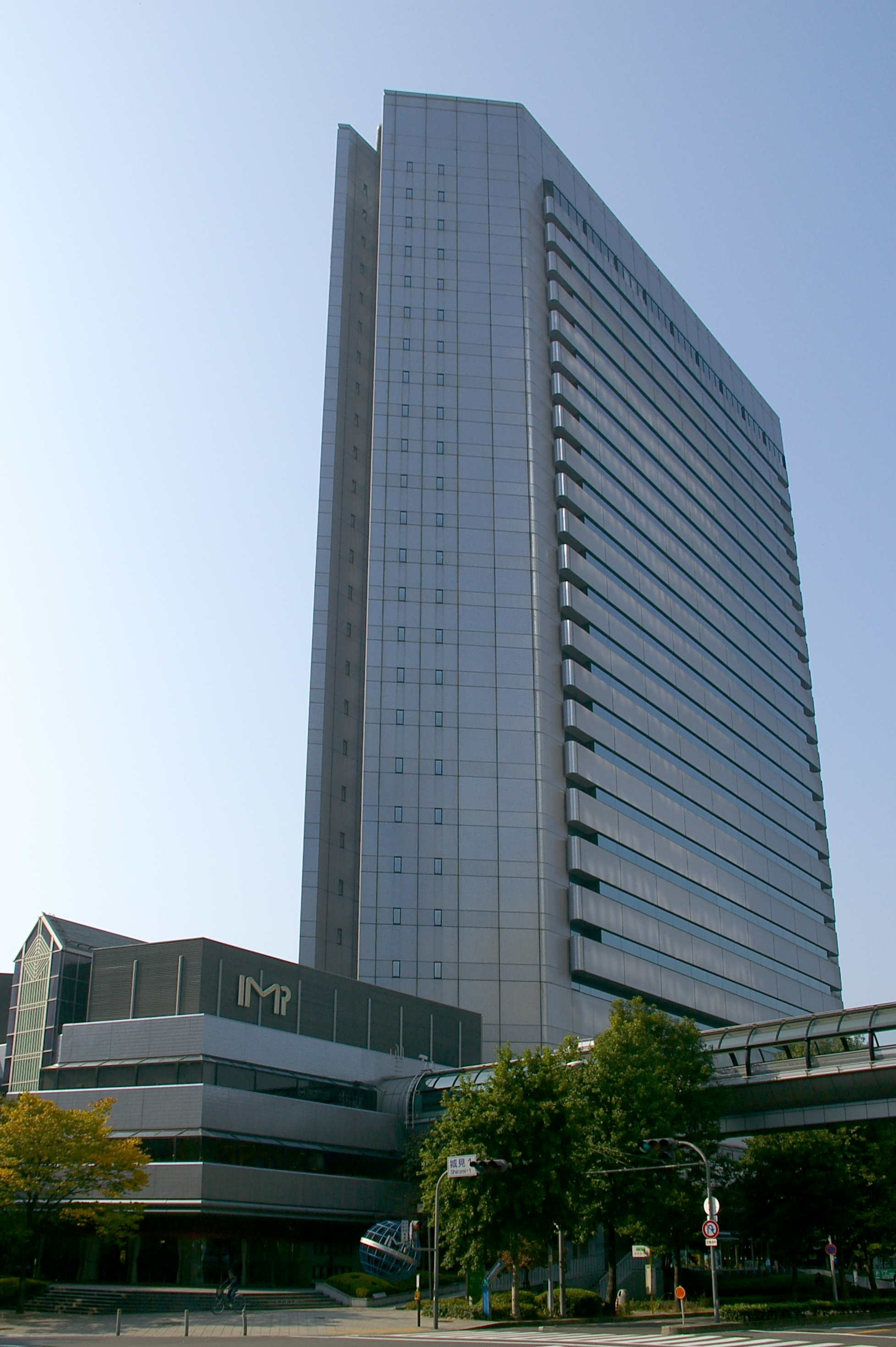
The Panasonic IMP Building in Osaka, Japan

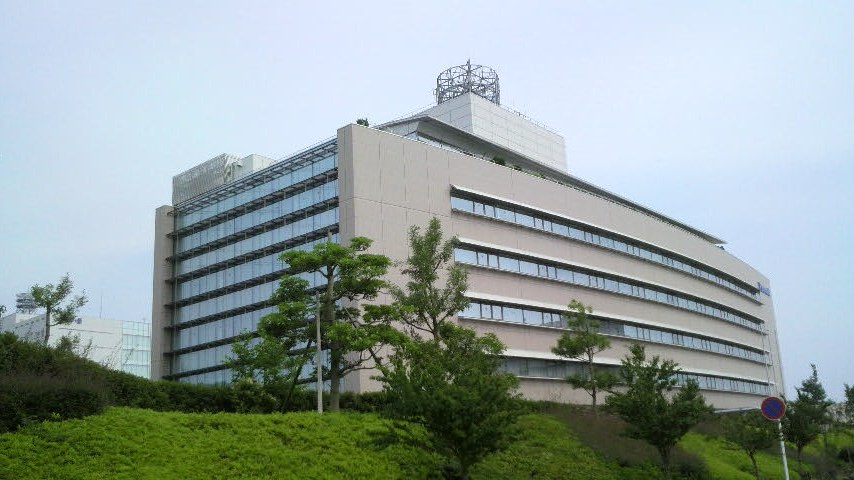
The Panasonic R&D facility at Yokosuka Research Park, Japan

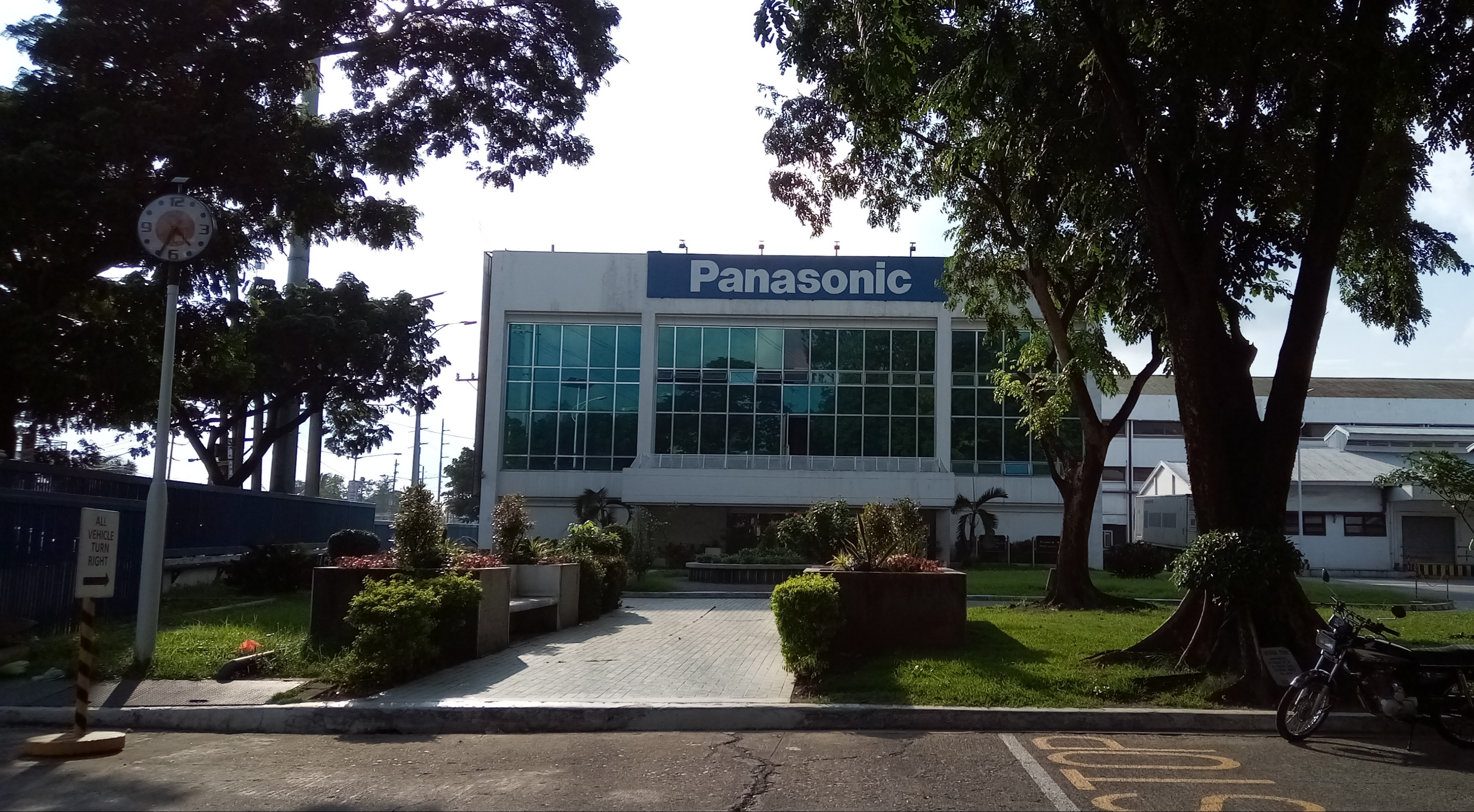
The headquarters of Panasonic Manufacturing Philippines Corporation (PMPC) in Taytay, Rizal

As of July 2020, Panasonic's operations are organized into seven "domain companies": Appliances, Life Solutions, Connected Solutions, Automotive, Industrial Solutions, and two overseas branches overseeing the businesses in the United States and Asia. Each of these companies may comprise multiple subsidiaries conducting actual operations.

=== Life Solutions ===
==== Panasonic Homes ====
Panasonic Homes (formerly PanaHome) was a Japanese real estate and construction company and a subsidiary of Life Solutions Company, Panasonic, founded as the housing unit of Matsushita Electric Works in 1963. In recent years, Panasonic Homes has been involved in developing smart cities. In 2019, it was announced that Toyota and Panasonic would initiate a process to merge their housing businesses, Toyota Housing and Misawa Homes from the former and Panasonic Homes of the latter, into a joint venture scheduled to be established in January 2020 and co-controlled by the two parties, named Prime Life Technologies Corporation.

=== Connected Solutions ===
==== Panasonic Avionics Corporation ====
Panasonic Avionics Corporation (PAC), a subsidiary of Panasonic Corporation of North America and a unit of Connected Solutions Company, Panasonic, is a supplier of in-flight entertainment (IFE) and communication systems. Headquartered in Irvine, California, where engineering, development and testing is performed while system installation, field engineering, major quality functions, certification and program management are performed at the Bothell, Washington, facility – Panasonic Avionics Corporation employs approximately 3,300 employees based in over 70 locations worldwide, with major facilities in London, Toulouse, Hamburg, Dallas, Dubai, and Singapore. A majority of the component manufacturing is carried out in Osaka, Japan.

In February 2017, Panasonic reported that the subsidiary was being investigated by American authorities under the FCPA.

==== Panasonic Mobile Communications ====
Panasonic Mobile Communications manufactures mobile phone handsets and related equipment. As of 2012, it had around a 20 percent share of the Japanese handset market. Panasonic used to market mobile phone handsets worldwide, but in December 2005 announced its withdrawal from overseas markets due to poor sales. Panasonic returned to the overseas market in 2012, with the release of the Panasonic Eluga Android-powered smartphone. In July 2013, Panasonic announced the company will not supply a new model of smartphone to NTT DoCoMo Inc., because NTT DoCoMo will focus with Sony and Samsung products. In Q2 2013, Panasonic Mobile Communications booked a 5.4 billion yen operating loss. From July 2013 to January 2018, Panasonic India has released one more series of Android Smartphones Panasonic P Series, along with Eluga Series.

=== Automotive ===
==== Automotive Systems division ====
Automotive Systems Business Division, Automotive Company, Panasonic, formerly Panasonic Automotive Systems (PAS), supplies OEM vehicle audio for manufactures such as Acura, Honda, Nissan and Volkswagen. Panasonic also incorporates supplying ELS and Fender OEM sound systems for vehicles.

==== Giga Nevada ====
Panasonic is the financial/technological partner of Tesla-owned Giga Nevada (Gigafactory 1) and has invested in the factory ever since the project's conception; in contrast to Tesla ever expanding its battery production to overseas, Panasonic has refrained from taking part in Tesla's ventures elsewhere; aside from Giga Nevada, it has its own sites in Japan from which it has served Tesla since before the completion of the Gigafactory.

==== Prime Planet Energy and Solutions ====
In 2020, Panasonic founded an electric vehicle battery joint venture with Toyota, named Prime Planet Energy & Solutions Inc. (PPES), after its status as the exclusive battery supplier to Tesla has been diminished amid the changes in market environment, such as the rises of the competitors from South Korea and China and Tesla's move to bring the development and manufacturing of battery cells in-house. Panasonic owns 49% of the venture. It was the first time the two companies joined hands in the realm of battery technology since Primearth EV Energy (PEVE) kicked off in 1996 to produce batteries for hybrid electric cars.

=== Overseas operations ===
==== Panasonic Corporation of North America ====
Panasonic Corporation of North America is Panasonic's principal subsidiary in the United States. It has been headquartered in Newark, New Jersey, since 2013, after being previously headquartered in Secaucus, since the 1980s; both Newark and Secaucus are located within New Jersey's Gateway Region.

Founded in New York City in September 1959 and a debut tenant of the Pan Am Building, it was known as Matsushita Electric Corporation of America (MECA) prior to 2005.

On September 4, 2024, Panasonic announced its return to the U.S. TV market, 8 years after it left in 2016.

Panasonic Eco Systems North America, a business unit of Panasonic North America, distributes renewable energy products in the United States and Canada. Established in 2012, Panasonic Eco Systems sells renewable energy systems and home energy management products, including high efficiency solar panels, battery storage systems, and indoor air quality products. It also distributes cordless assembly tools used on factory assembly lines. In 2016, the company began expanding its network of residential solar installers to market Panasonic Solar HIT (heterojunction with intrinsic thin layer) panels and battery storage nationally, reaching 150 authorized installers by November 2018. The company began offering a 25-year warranty for its HIT photovoltaic modules, compared to the industry standard at the time of 10 years, in 2017. In 2019, Panasonic introduced its EverVolt brand of solar and battery storage products. The company transitioned its solar panel manufacturing to OEMs in early 2021 to focus on offering a wider range of products. Later that year, Panasonic debuted the EverVolt 2.0 energy storage system rated for outdoor use.

==== Panasonic Europe ====
Panasonic's principal subsidiaries in Europe are Panasonic Europe Ltd. and Panasonic Marketing Europe GmbH. Panasonic Europe is headquartered in London, England, but it is moving its headquarters to Amsterdam, Netherlands, due to Brexit. Panasonic employs around 12,000 people in Europe, and the region generates around 10 percent of its total revenues. In 2012, Panasonic had around a 10 per cent share of the consumer electronics market in Europe, ranking third behind Samsung Electronics (with 26 per cent) and LG Electronics (with 12 percent).

Panasonic operates a chain of stores in the United Kingdom and Ireland called "Panasonic Store" which exclusively sell Panasonic products. Prior to 2008 the chain was named "shop@Panasonic".

In November 2010, Panasonic Electric Works established Panasonic Electric Works Vossloh-Schwabe Serbia d.o.o, a new company in Svilajnac, Serbia, to manufacture energy-efficient electronic devices (ballasts) for lighting fixtures. Volume production commenced in January 2011.

In May 2015, Panasonic launched its virtual solar service to UK consumers. The service allows users to run a simulation to provide an estimate of how much a rooftop solar installation would produce if it were installed in their home.

==== Panasonic India ====
Daizo Ito is Group President for Panasonic Regional Headquarters India (situated in Haryana) at Panasonic India Pvt. Ltd. Panasonic India makes washing machines, refrigerators, electric rice cookers, electric irons, mixer-grinders/blenders and other home appliances for the Indian market.

Panasonic Life Solutions India Pvt Ltd (formerly known as Anchor Electricals Pvt. Ltd.), an Indian company which makes electric lamps, switches, sockets and other electrical accessories, is a wholly owned subsidiary of Panasonic Corporation.

==== PT Panasonic Gobel Indonesia ====
PT Panasonic Gobel Indonesia (formerly known as PT National Gobel and PT National Panasonic Gobel) is the name of the company's Indonesia division based in Cawang, East Jakarta. Tomonobu Otsu is the current President Director and Rachmat Gobel is the current President Commissioner. It is a joint venture between Panasonic Corporation Japan and the Gobel Group of Indonesia.

== Former operations ==
=== MCA Inc. ===
Matsushita bought American media company MCA Inc. for US$6.6 billion. In 1995, it sold 80% of MCA's shares to Canadian drink company Seagram. MCA was renamed Universal Studios Inc. in 1996, after which Universal Pictures and Television transferred from Vivendi, then to General Electric, becoming what is now NBCUniversal, now a division of Comcast. The music division became Universal Music Group, acquired and wholly owned by Vivendi up until 2019.

=== Panasonic 3DO ===
Panasonic manufactured 3DO gaming systems from 1993 to 1996 alongside other manufacturers backing the standard, however it was not a success. There were a total of 2 million systems sold during its lifespan, although it is not known how many of these were sold by each manufacturer. Panasonic obtained exclusive rights to develop and manufacture the 3DO's successor, the M2, after purchasing the properties and technology from The 3DO Company, but ultimately backed out of releasing it in 1997 due to the highly competitive state of the console gaming market at that time.

=== Panasonic Healthcare ===
In 2014, Panasonic Healthcare was bought by outside investors and renamed PHCHD, which stands for Panasonic HealthCare HD. It mainly makes cryogenic and ULT freezers for laboratories and sterilization equipment.

=== Panasonic Semiconductor Solutions ===
Panasonic had been in the semiconductor industry since 1957, when it started the mass production of silicon transistors and bipolar ICs. From 2012 onwards the company had implemented a series of measures to boost productivity of the business, including transfers of its production facilities to a joint venture with TowerJazz, and the system-on-a-chip designing unit to Panasonic/Fujitsu joint venture Socionext.

In 2019, Panasonic decided to sell its remaining chip business and the stake in the joint venture with TowerJazz to Nuvoton following heavy losses.

== Products and R&D ==
Panasonic has offered a wide range of products and services, including air conditioners, refrigerators, washing machines, compressors, lighting, televisions, personal computers (Matsushita JR series, Let's Note), mobile phones (as a subsidiary of TCL Electronics), audio equipment, cameras, broadcasting equipment, projectors, automotive electronics, aircraft in-flight entertainment systems, semiconductors, lithium batteries, electrical components, optical devices, bicycles, electronic materials, video game systems (3DO), and photovoltaic modules. Ventilation appliances such as electric fans are manufactured under KDK and rebranded as Panasonic.

In 2025, the World Intellectual Property Organization (WIPO)’s Annual PCT Review ranked Panasonic number of patent applications published under the PCT System as 6th in the world, with 2,094 patent applications being published during 2025.

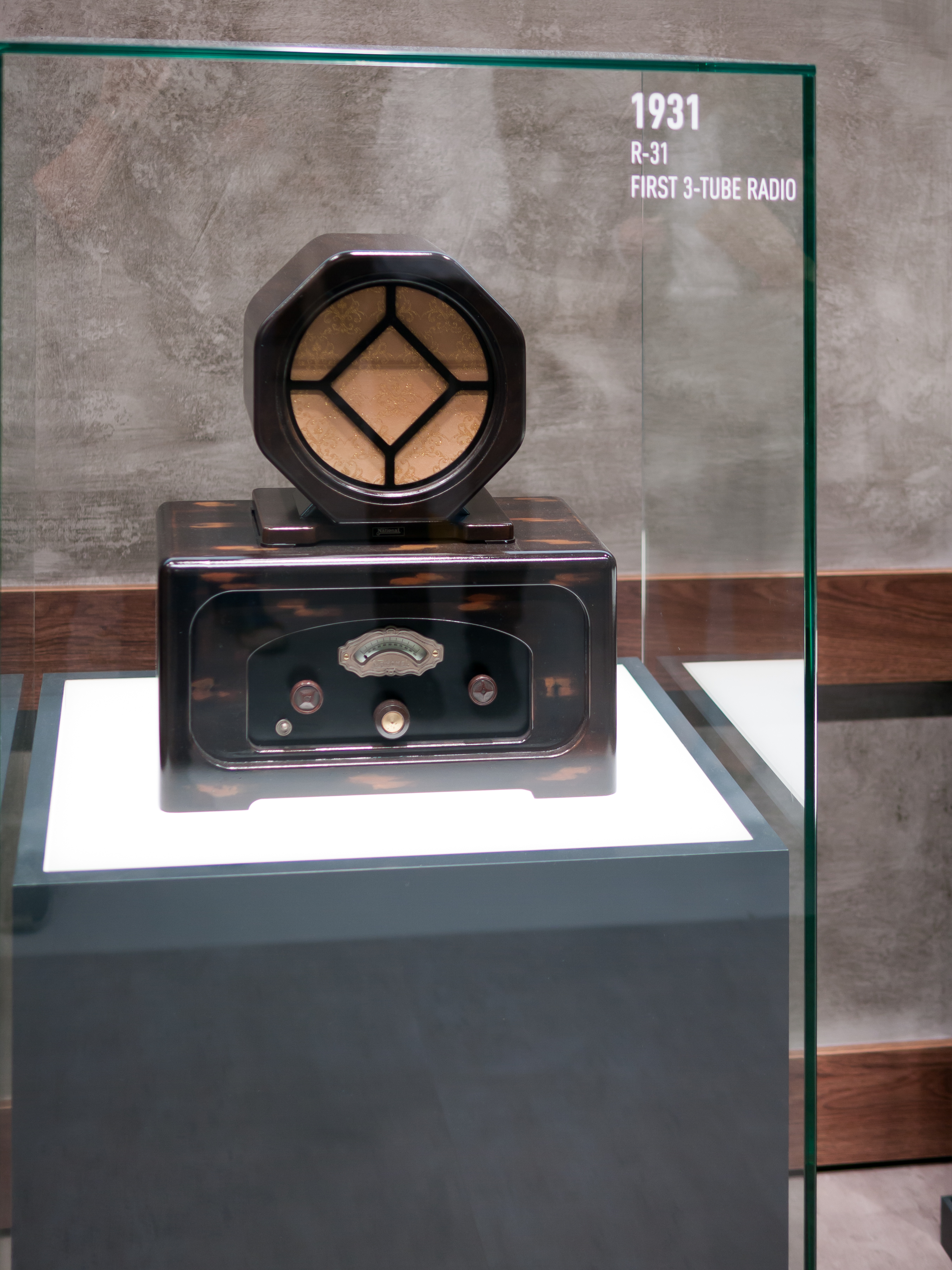
R-31 tube radio

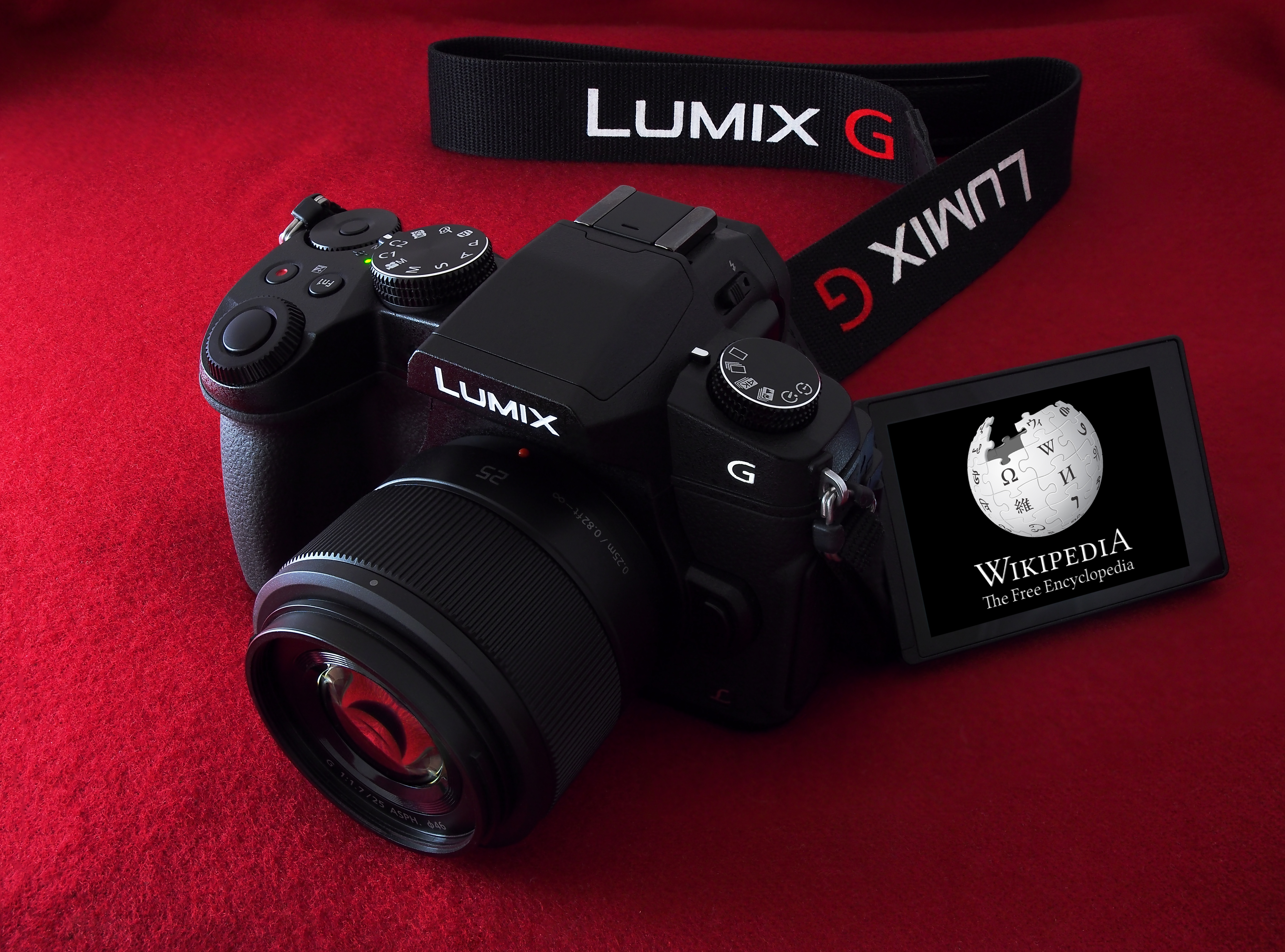
A Panasonic Lumix camera

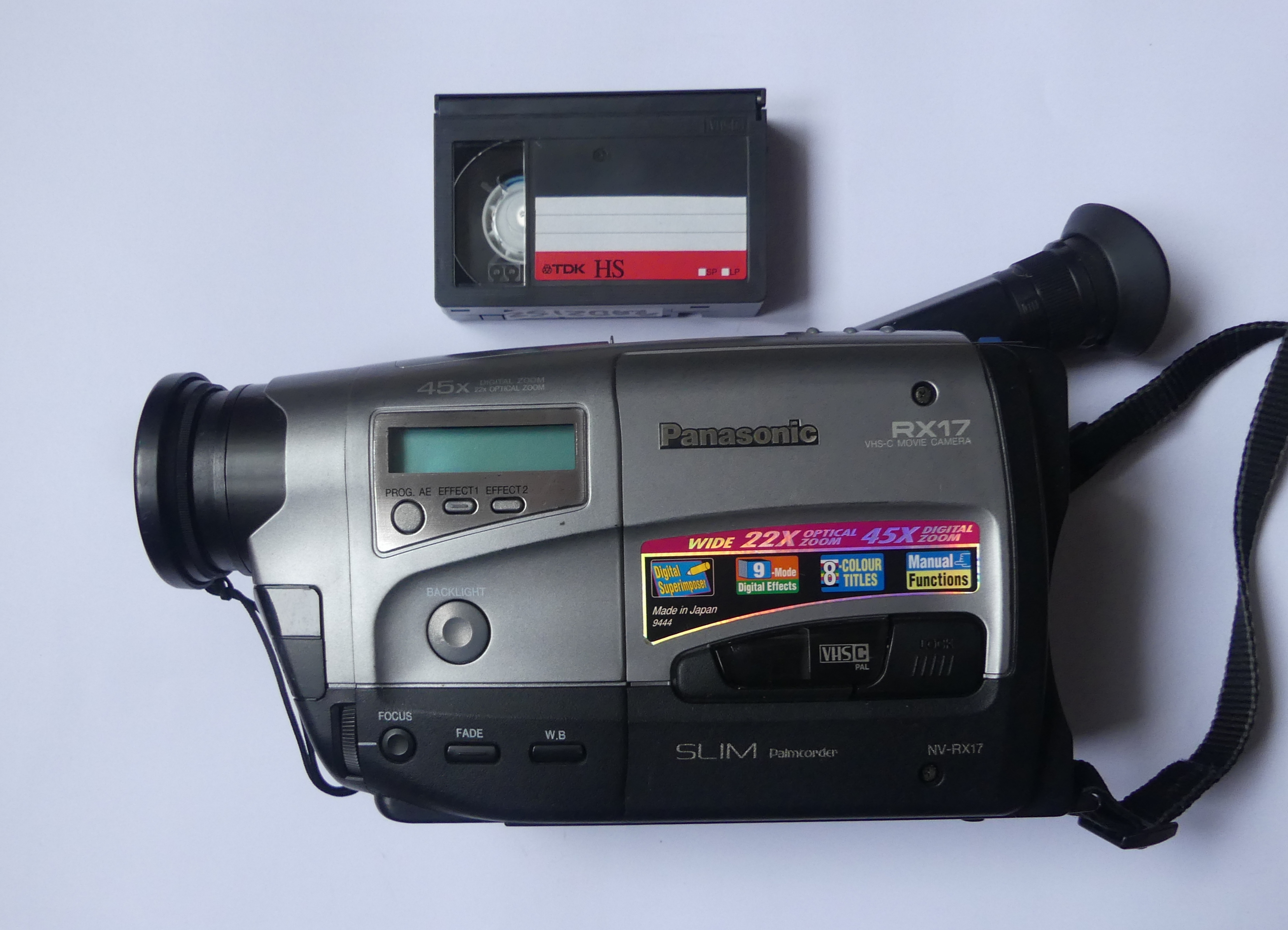
Panasonic camcorder VHS-C

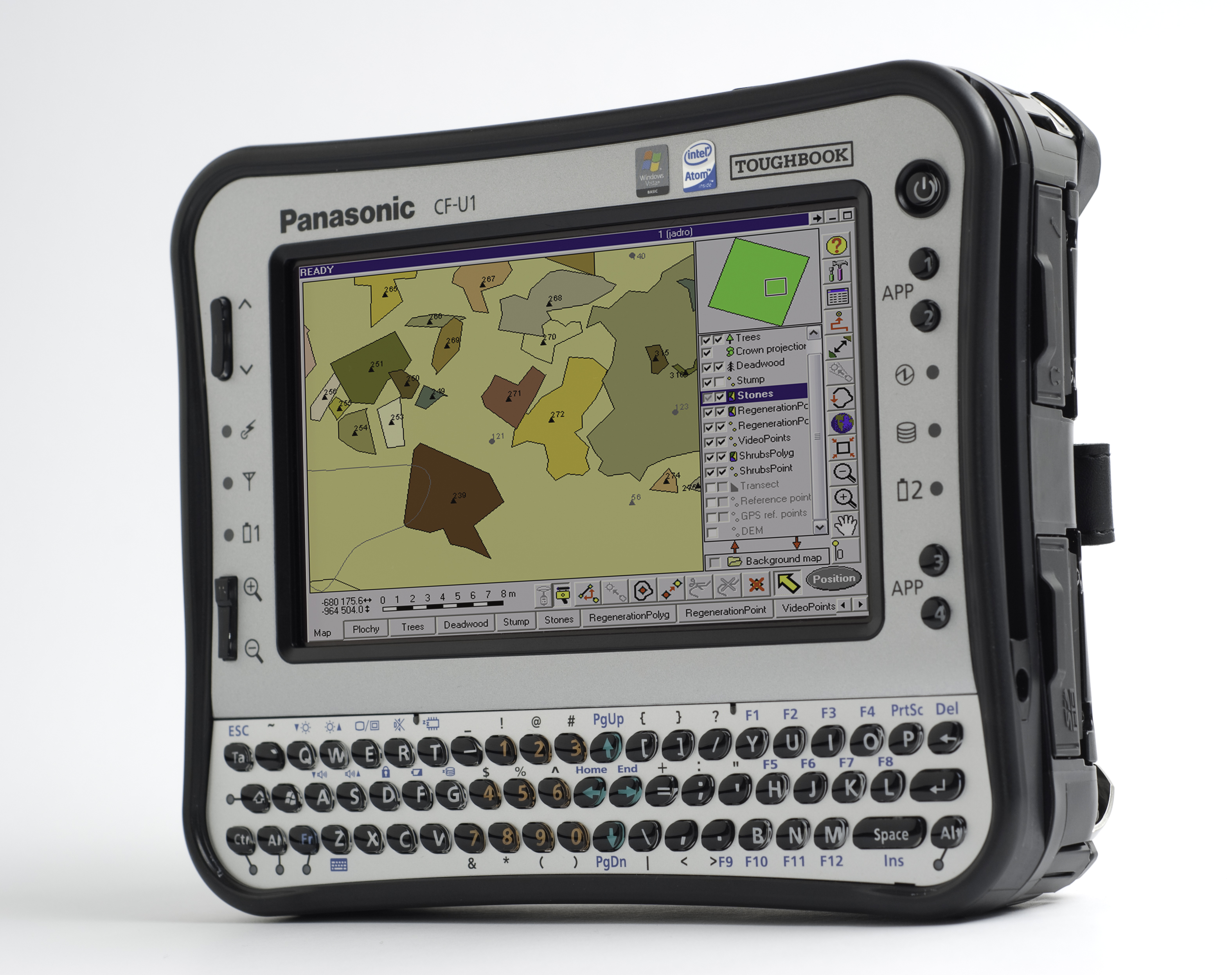
A Panasonic Toughbook field computer

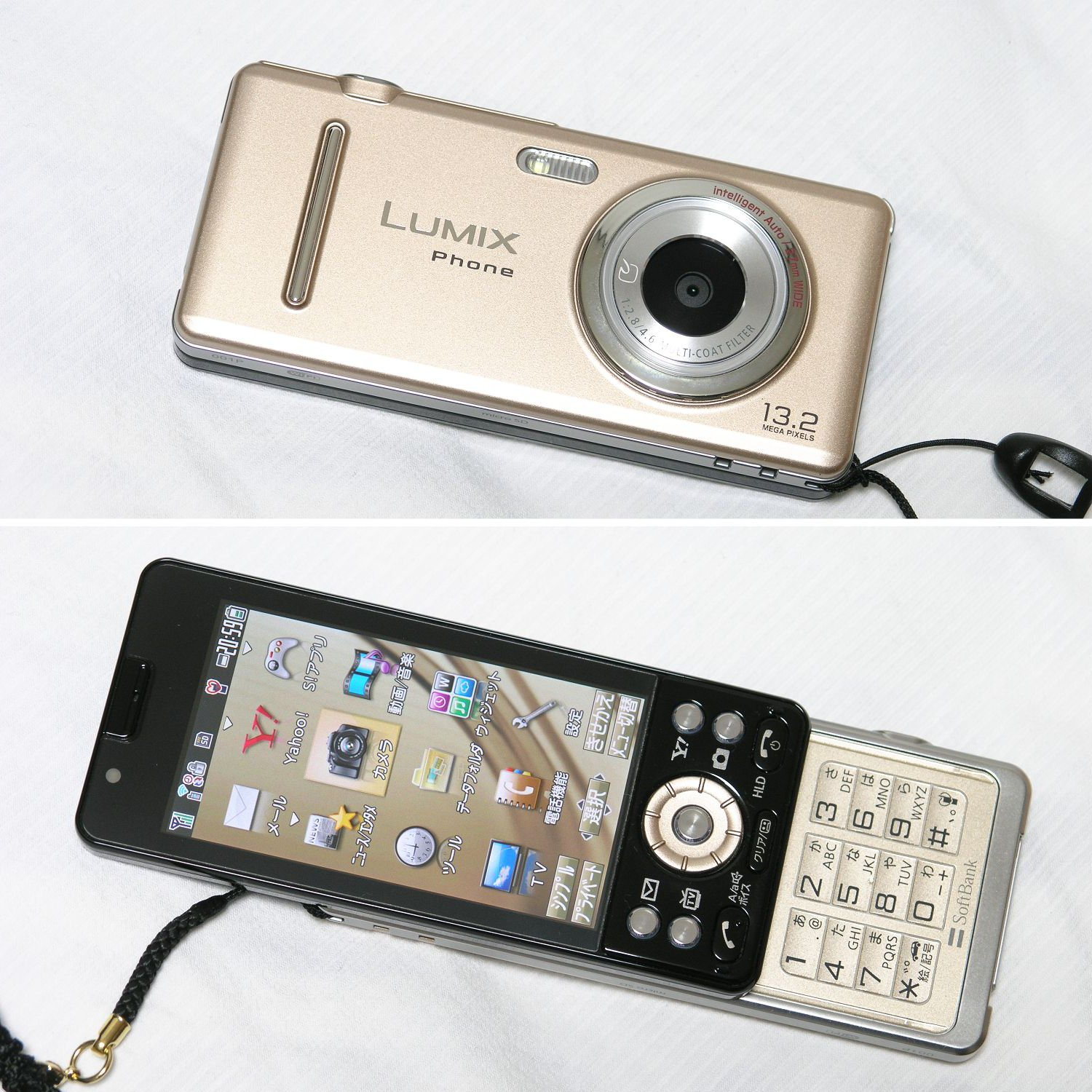
A Panasonic mobile phone

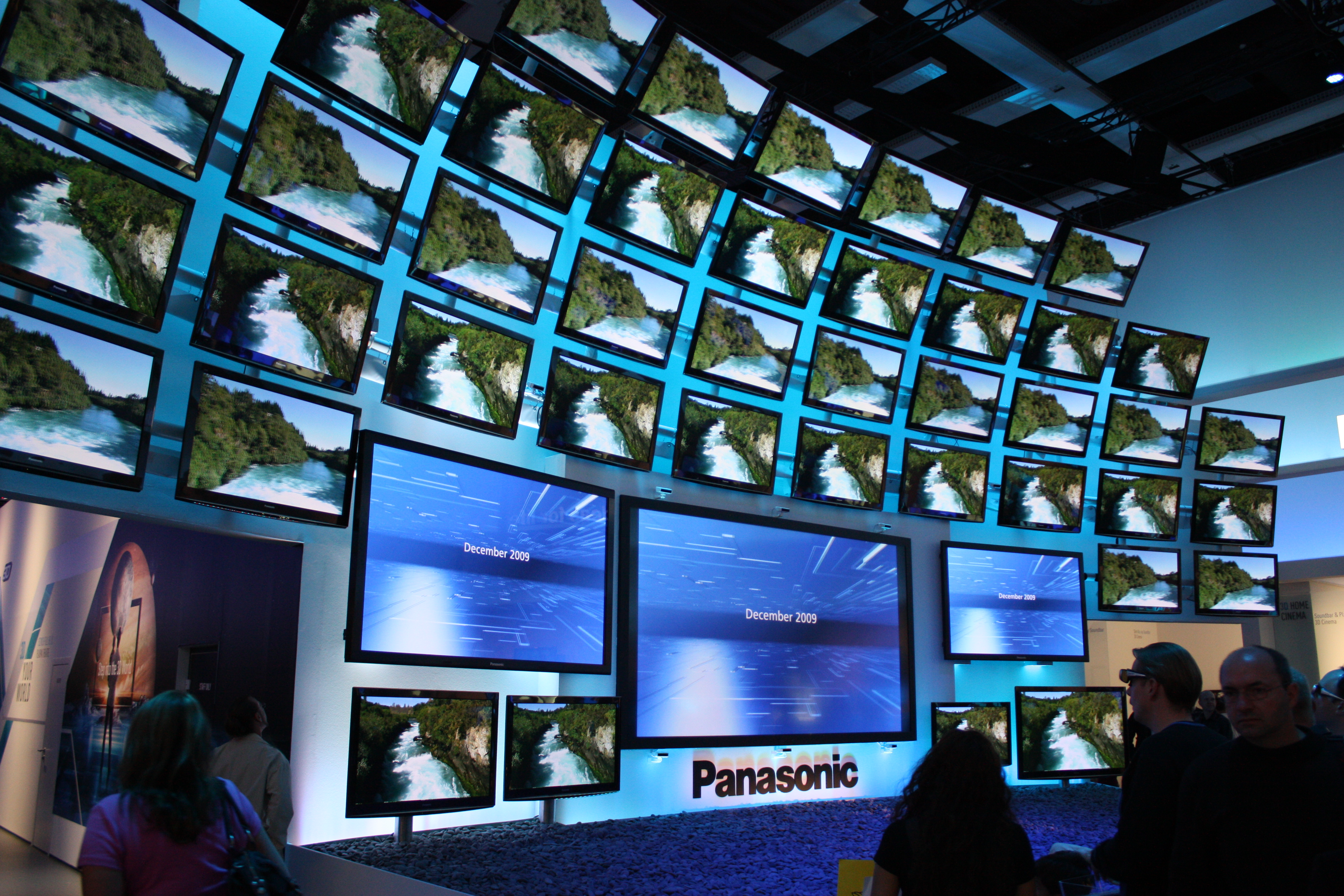
A display of Panasonic televisions

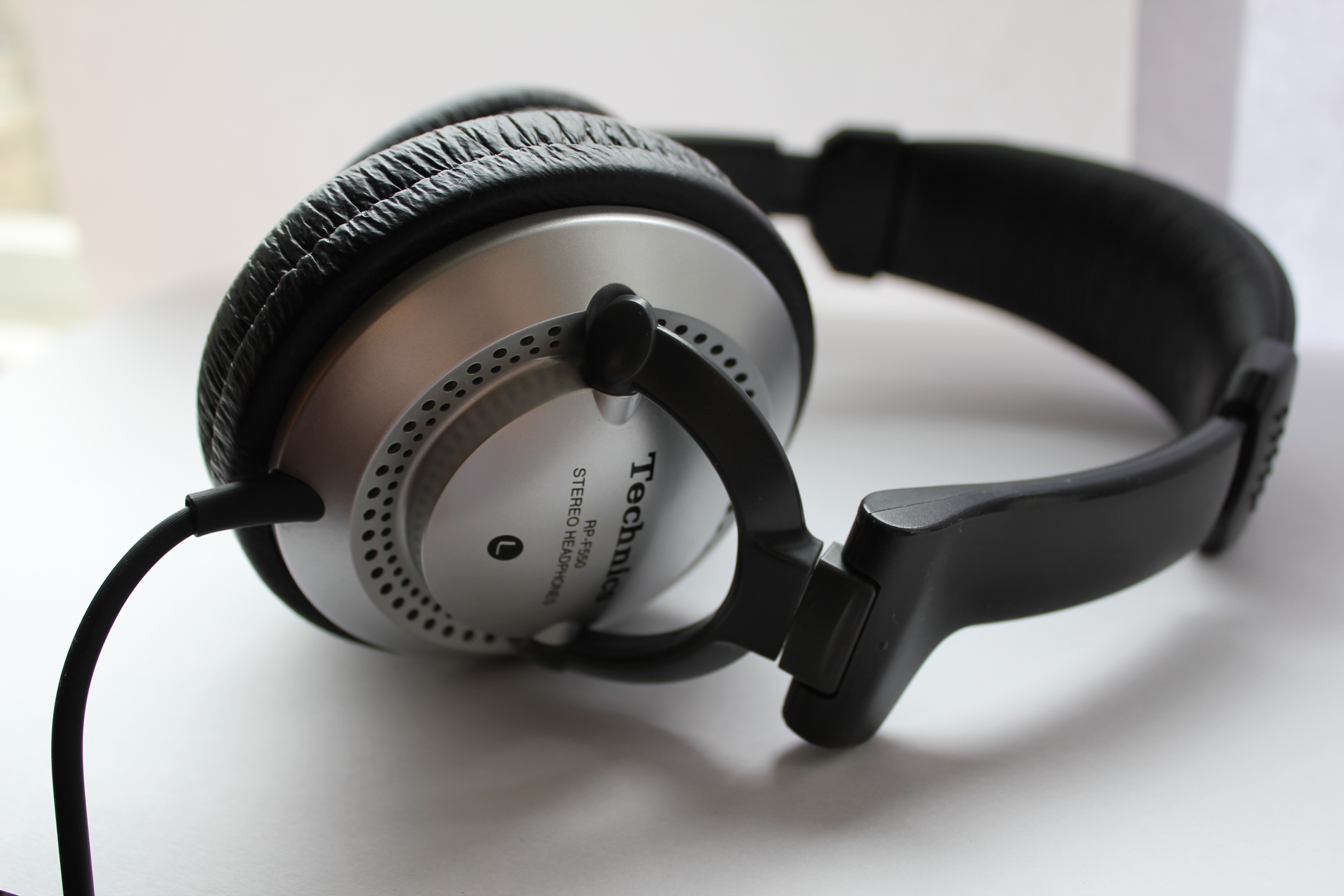
Technics headphones

== Sponsorships ==
=== Association football ===
Panasonic owns Gamba Osaka, a club from the J.League, the Japanese professional football league.

Panasonic is an official partner and sponsor of AFC Champions League and Major League Soccer.

Between 1981 and 1983, Panasonic was the shirt sponsor of English football club Nottingham Forest F.C.

Between 1983 and 1990, Panasonic was the shirt sponsor of Dutch football club FC Den Bosch.

Between 1989 and 1993, Panasonic was the shirt sponsor of French football club Olympique de Marseille.

Between 1995 and 2001, Panasonic was the shirt sponsor of English football club Huddersfield Town F.C.

Between 2005 and 2006, Panasonic was the shirt sponsor of Brazilian football club Santos F.C.

On 16 January 2010, Panasonic signed a three-year, ₹ 47 million (£518,500) jersey sponsorship deal for the India national football team.

=== Motorsports ===
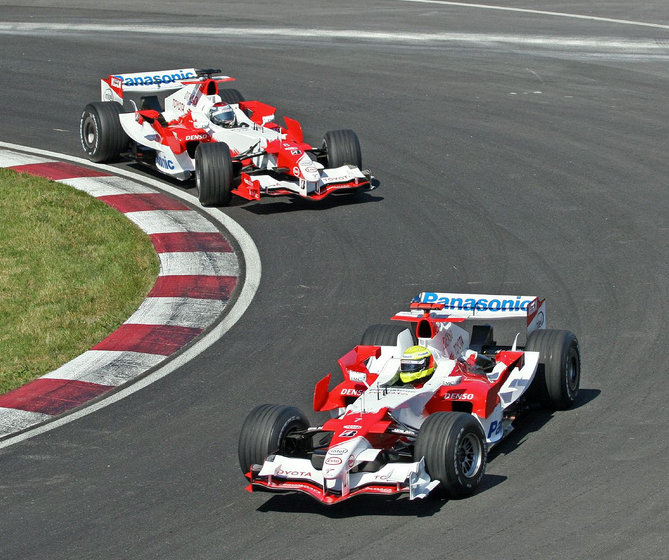
Panasonic was the principal sponsor of the now-defunct Toyota Racing Formula One team.

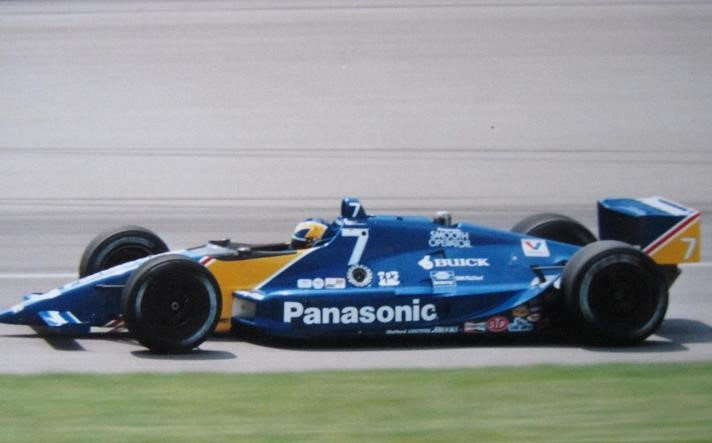
Hiro Matsushita in 1991

Panasonic was a primary sponsor of Toyota's Formula One program, Panasonic Toyota Racing and which later the two parties reunited in FIA World Rally Championship with Toyota Gazoo Racing World Rally Team starting from 2017 season onwards. Hiro Matsushita, grandson of the company founder, is a former race car driver who ran a company overseeing sponsorship arrangements for the company.

Panasonic was also a sponsor in NASCAR's Busch Series in 2005, sponsoring the No. 67 Smith Brothers Racing Dodge for Ken Schrader, Bryan Reffner, C.W. Smith, and Johnny Benson Jr. In 2007, Panasonic became a technology partner with Hendrick Motorsports and served as a primary sponsor of the team's No. 24 car with Jeff Gordon for two races in 2014 and throughout 2015.

On 8 September 2016, Panasonic was unveiled as the title sponsor for the new Jaguar Formula E team. Panasonic currently sponsors Japanese IndyCar Series driver Takuma Sato in his Rahal Letterman Lanigan Racing car.

=== Other ===
Between 1988 and 2024, Panasonic was a top level sponsor of the Olympic Games.

Panasonic was the official partner and sponsor of the Boston Celtics from 1975 to 1989, along with Technics. Various Panasonic ads appeared at the old Boston Garden during the 1980s.

Panasonic owns Panasonic Wild Knights a rugby club base in Gunma just outside of Tokyo. They compete in the highest level of rugby in Japan Top League.

Panasonic is the current sponsor for the ride Monsters, Inc. Ride & Go Seek at Tokyo Disneyland Park. It opened in 2009.

On 14 February 2017, Panasonic was unveiled as the main sponsor of Lega Basket Serie A, the highest professional basketball league in Italy and one of the top ranked national domestic league in Europe.

== Environmental record ==
Panasonic is ranked in joint 11th place (out of 16) in Greenpeace's Guide to Greener Electronics, which ranks electronics manufacturers on policies and practices to reduce its impact on the climate, produce greener products and make its operations more sustainable. The company is one of the top scorers on the Products criteria, praised for its good product life cycles and the number of products which are free from polyvinyl chloride plastic (PVC). It also scores maximum points for the energy efficiency of its products with 100 percent of its TVs meeting the latest Energy Star standards and exceeding the standby power requirement.

However, Panasonic's score is let down by its low score on the Energy criteria, with the Guide stating it must focus on planned reductions of greenhouse gases (GHG), set targets to reduce GHG emissions by at least 30% by 2015 and increase renewable energy use by 2020.

In 2014, an article in The Guardian reported that Panasonic will compensate its expatriate workers in China a "hazard pay" as compensation for the chronic air pollution they are subjected to as they work.

In 2020, Panasonic joined WIPO GREEN as an official partner in an effort to address climate change.

In February 2022, the Wall Street Journal reported that Panasonic got its highest-emitting Chinese factory to "virtually net zero" carbon dioxide.

== Senior leadership ==
- Chairman: Kazuhiro Tsuga (since April 2021)
- President and CEO: Yuki Kusumi (since April 2021)

=== List of former chairmen ===
1. Kōnosuke Matsushita (1961–1973)
2. Arataro Takahashi (1973–1977)
3. Masaharu Matsushita (1973–2000)
4. Yoichi Morishita (2000–2006)
5. Kunio Nakamura (2006–2012)
6. Fumio Ōtsubo (2012–2021)

=== List of former presidents and CEOs ===
1. Kōnosuke Matsushita (1918–1961)
2. Masaharu Matsushita (1961–1977)
3. Toshihiko Yamashita (1977–1986)
4. Akio Tanii (1986–1993)
5. Yoichi Morishita (1993–2000)
6. Kunio Nakamura (2000–2006)
7. Fumio Ōtsubo (2006–2012)
8. Kazuhiro Tsuga (2012–2021)

== Slogan history ==
- "Just slightly ahead of our time" (1971–2003, outside of Japan)
- "Even more than you expected [out of the blue]" (1970s–1996, Australia)
- "Human Electronics" (1988-1990)
- "What's on Panasonic" (1990–1996)
- "The quest for zero defect" (1990s–2003, South Africa)
- "Panasonic, The One That I Want" (1996–2003, USA)
- "What's New by Panasonic" (1996–2003)
- "Ideas For Life" (2003–2013, Global)
- "A Better Life, A Better World" (2013–2023)
- "Wonders!" (2014–2017, Japan)
- "Let's Live Life Better" (2017–2018, Indonesia)
- "Live Your Best" (2022–present, Global)
- "Create Today. Enrich Tomorrow." (2022–present)
- "Make New" (2023–present, Japan)

== See also ==
- List of Panasonic camcorders
- List of companies of Japan
- Konosuke Matsushita
- Masaharu Matsushita
- Hiro Matsushita
- Panasonic Cycle Technology
