= Fumio Ōtsubo =

Japanese entrepreneur

- Born: September 5, 1945 (age 80); Osaka Prefecture, Japan
- Education: Kansai University
- Occupations: President and CEO, Panasonic

Fumio Ōtsubo (大坪文雄, Fumio Ōtsubo; born September 5, 1945) was the President of Panasonic. He also serves as a member of the board of Teijin

== Early life ==
Fumio Ōtsubo was born in 1945 in Osaka, Japan, where he attended the Kansai University.

== Career ==
Fumio Ōtsubo began his career with Panasonic in 1971. On June 3, 2006, Panasonic announced that Ōtsubo had been made a president of its corporate executive group.
