= Matico =

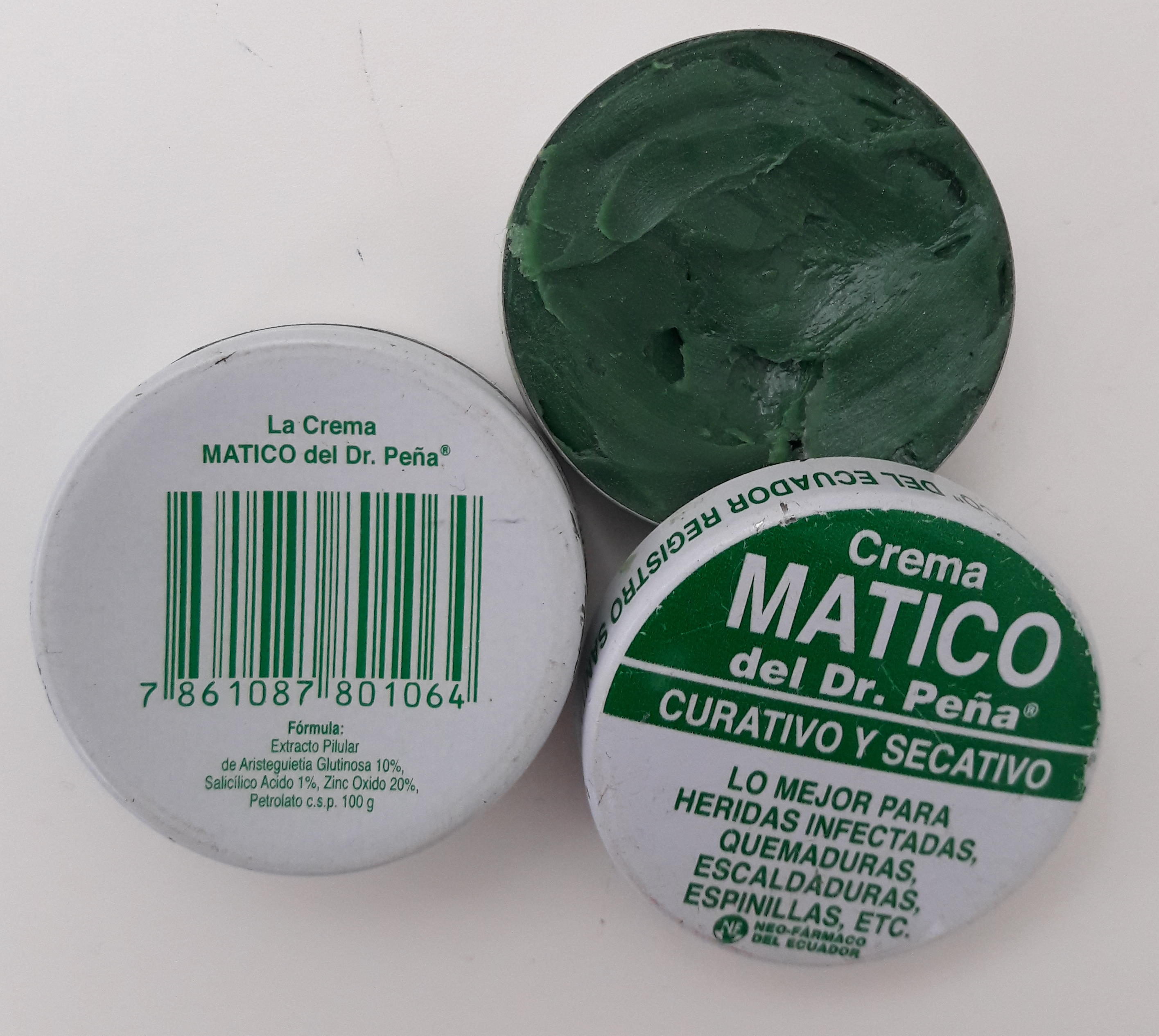

Matico is a Spanish language common name for several plants and may refer to:

- Aristeguietia glutinosa, known as matico in Ecuador
- Buddleja globosa, known as matico in Chile and Argentina
- Piper aduncum, known as matico in Peru
