= Buddleja grandiflora =

Scientific classification
- Kingdom: Plantae
- Clade: Embryophytes
- Clade: Tracheophytes
- Clade: Spermatophytes
- Clade: Angiosperms
- Clade: Eudicots
- Clade: Asterids
- Order: Lamiales
- Family: Scrophulariaceae
- Genus: Buddleja
- Species: B. grandiflora

Binomial name
- Buddleja grandiflora Cham. & Schltdl.

Synonyms
- Buddleja sancti-leopoldi Kraenzl.; Buddleja paludicola Kraenzl.

Species of flowering plant

Buddleja grandiflora is endemic to the marshy fields and river margins of southern Brazil, and adjacent areas of Argentina and Uruguay. The species was first described and named by Chamisso and von Schlechtendal in 1827.

== Description ==
Buddleja grandiflora is a shrub 1 – 2 m high, and unlike most South American members of the genus, is hermaphroditic, not dioecious. The young branches are subquadrangular, and covered with a white tomentum, bearing leaves subsessile or with a petiole < 1 cm, narrowly lanceolate, 5 – 10 cm long by 1 – 2.5 cm wide, membranaceous, tomentose or glabrescent above, and lanose below. The yellow inflorescence is 5 – 15 cm long, comprising two orders of branches. The sessile perfect flowers are borne in pairs of cymes, each with 1 – 6 flowers. The tubular corolla is 10 – 12 mm long. Unusually, the spongy seeds have buoyancy cells at their bases enabling them to float and withstand flooding.

The species is closely related to B. cestriflora, B. stachyoides, B. tubiflora, and B. hatschbachii.

== Cultivation ==
The shrub is not known to be in cultivation.
