= List of ambassadors of Belgium to the United Kingdom =

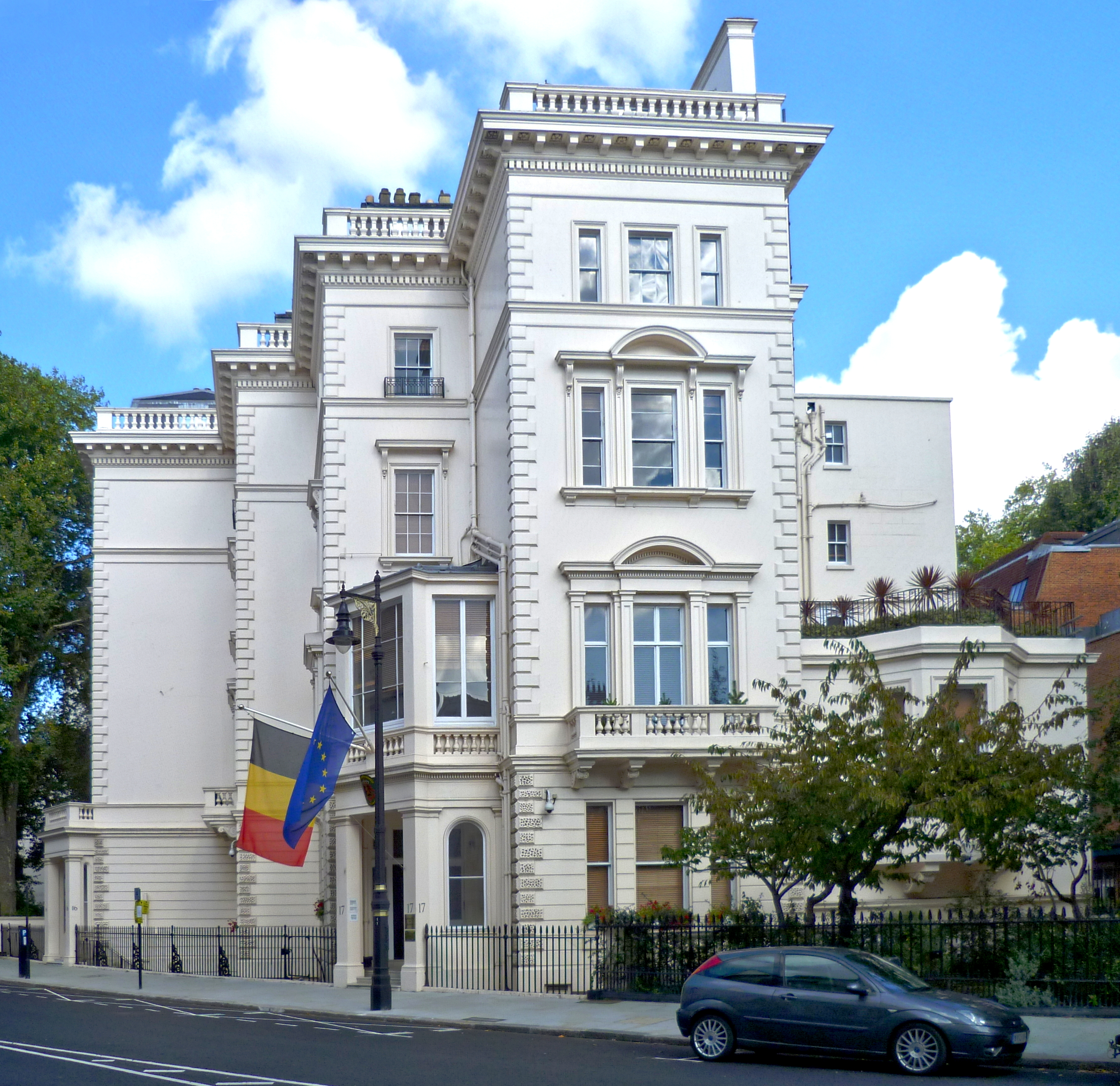
The Belgian embassy in London, 2015.

This is a list of ambassadors from Belgium to the United Kingdom, who head the Embassy of Belgium, London. Formally, they are the ambassador of His Majesty the King of the Belgians to the Court of St. James's.

== History ==
After the Belgian Revolution and the establishment of the Kingdom of Belgium on 4 October 1830, the United Kingdom was one of the first states to recognize the sovereignty of the Belgian state and to establish diplomatic relations. For Belgium, the London legation became the most important foreign diplomatic relationships. The British government supported the convening of the London Conference of 1830 and Treaty of London in 1839, which resulted in the international recognition of Belgium.

== Belgian envoys and ambassadors to the United Kingdom ==
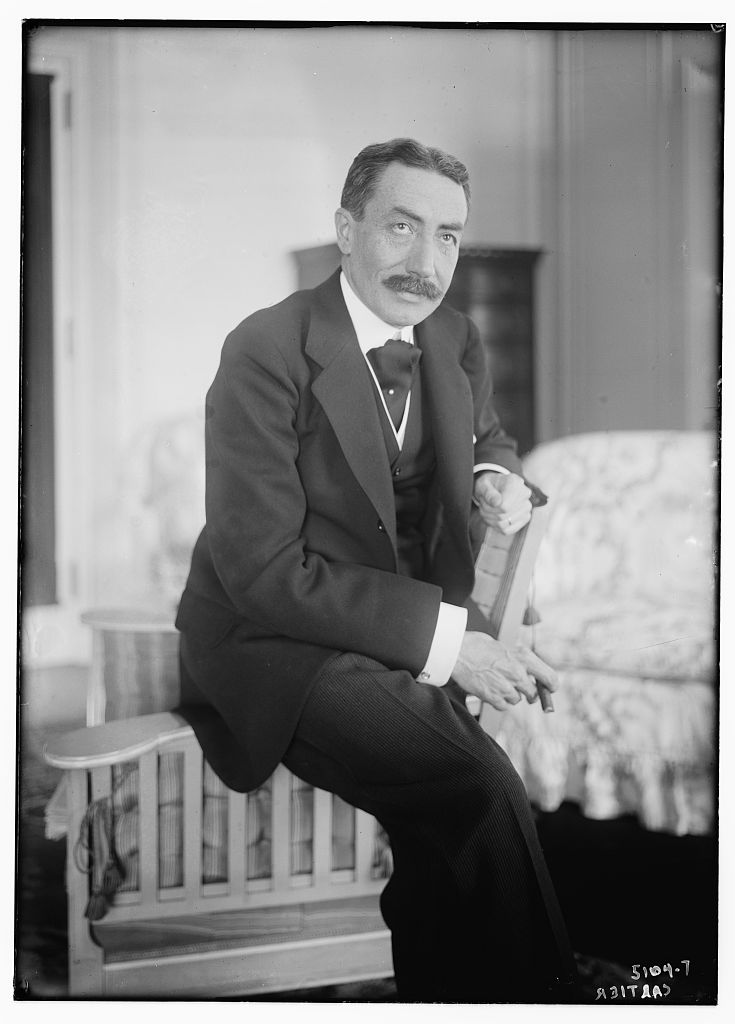
Baron Emile de Cartier de Marchienne, 1920

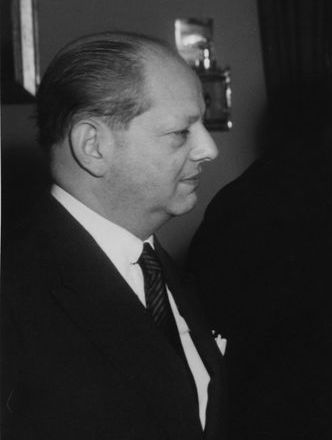
Baron Robert Rothschild, 1961

- 1831–1845: Sylvain Van de Weyer (Minister Plenipotentiary)
- 1845–1846: Charles Drouet
- 1846–1867: Sylvain Van de Weyer (Minister Plenipotentiary)
- 1867–1869: Aldephonse du Jardin (Minister Plenipotentiary)
- 1869–1872: Napoléon-Alcindor de Beaulieu (Minister Plenipotentiary)
- 1872–1894: Ignace-Henri de Solvyns (Minister Plenipotentiary)
- 1894–1903: Edouard Whettnall (Minister Plenipotentiary)
- 1903–1917: Count Charles Maximilien de Lalaing (Minister Plenipotentiary)
- 1917–1927: Ludovic Moncher (Minister Plenipotentiary)
- 1927–1946: Baron Emile de Cartier de Marchienne (Minister Plenipotentiary)
- 1946–1952: Alain Obert de Thieusies (Minister Plenipotentiary)
- 1953–1958: Alain du Parc de Locmaria (Ambassador)
- 1958–1962: Réné van Meerbeke
- 1962–1965: Jacques de Thier
- 1965–1972: Jean van den Bosch
- 1973–1976: Robert Rothschild
- 1977–1984: Robert Vaes
- 1984–1990: Jean-Paul Van Bellinghen
- 1990–1994: Herman Dehennin
- 1994–1997: Jonkheer Prosper Thuysbaert
- 1997–2002: Lode Willems
- 2002–2006: Baron Thierry de Gruben
- 2006–2010: Jean-Michel Veranneman de Watervliet
- 2010–2014: Johan C. Verbeke
- 2014–2017: Guy Trouveroy
- 2017–2020: Rudolf Huygelen
- 2020–2024: Bruno van der Pluijm
- 2025–present: Jeroen Cooreman
