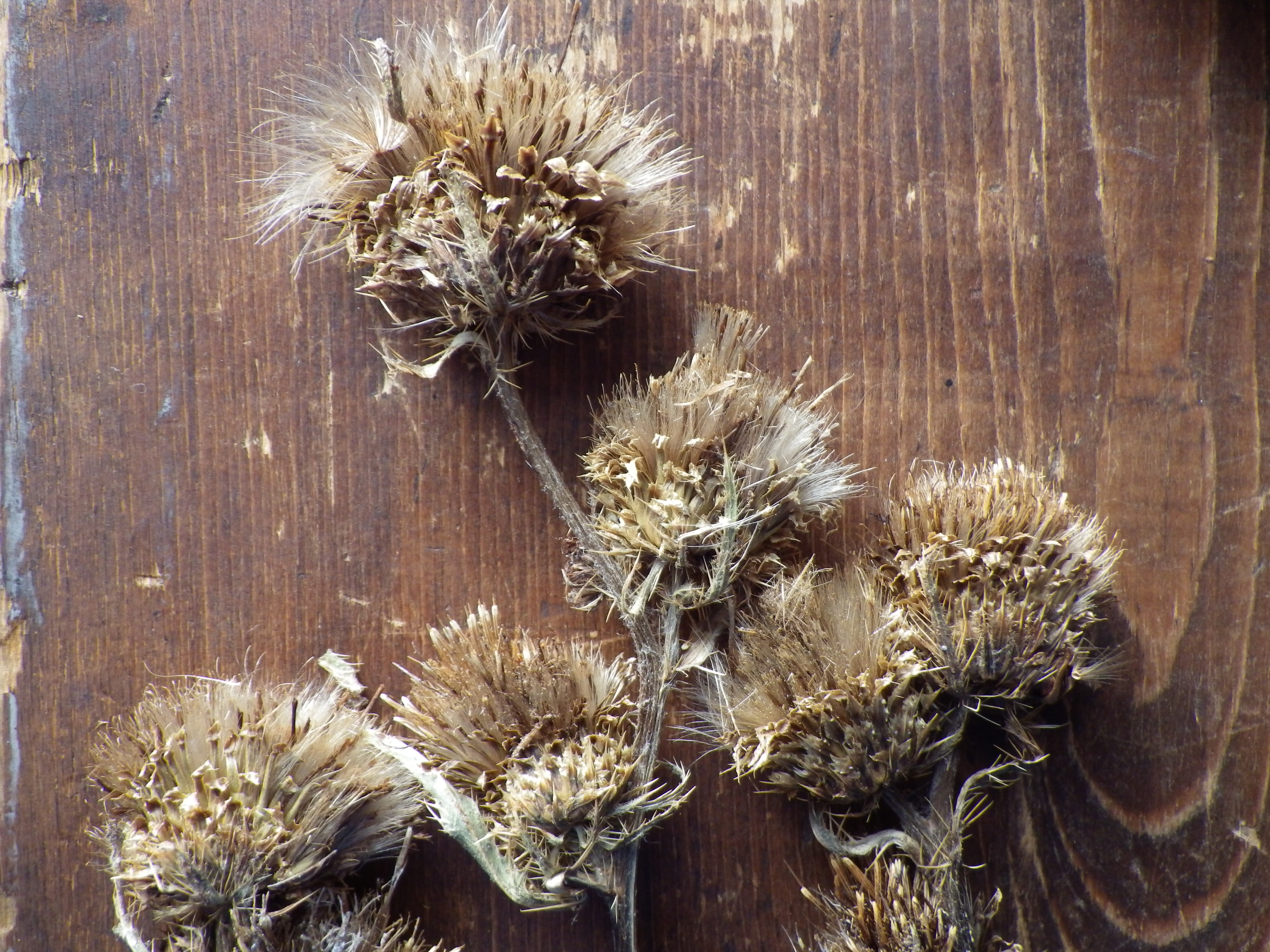
- Dead specimen

Scientific classification
- Kingdom: Plantae
- Clade: Tracheophytes
- Clade: Angiosperms
- Clade: Eudicots
- Clade: Asterids
- Order: Asterales
- Family: Asteraceae
- Genus: Cirsium
- Species: C. longistylum

Binomial name
- Cirsium longistylum R.J.Moore & Frankton

= Cirsium longistylum =

Species of thistle

Cirsium longistylum, the long-style thistle, is a North American species of plants in the tribe Cardueae within the family Asteraceae. The species is found only in the central part of the State of Montana in the United States, in the portions of the Rocky Mountains called the Big Belt, Castle, Elkhorn, and Little Belt ranges.

Cirsium longistylum is a biennial or perennial herb up to 150 cm (60 inches or 5 feet) tall, with a large taproot. Leaves are up to 30 cm (26 inches) long with thin, green on the upper side but gray to white on the underside because of numerous woolly hairs; spines along the edges of the leaves. There are a few flower heads, each head with white disc florets but no ray florets. The name of the species refers to the long white styles that stick out of the florets, much longer than the corollas.
