= William John Bates van de Weyer =

British botanist (1870–1946)

William John Bates van de Weyer (1870– 1 April 1946) was a British Militia officer who won lasting fame in horticulture as the first to hybridize a South American species of Buddleja with an Asiatic species while on leave during World War I.

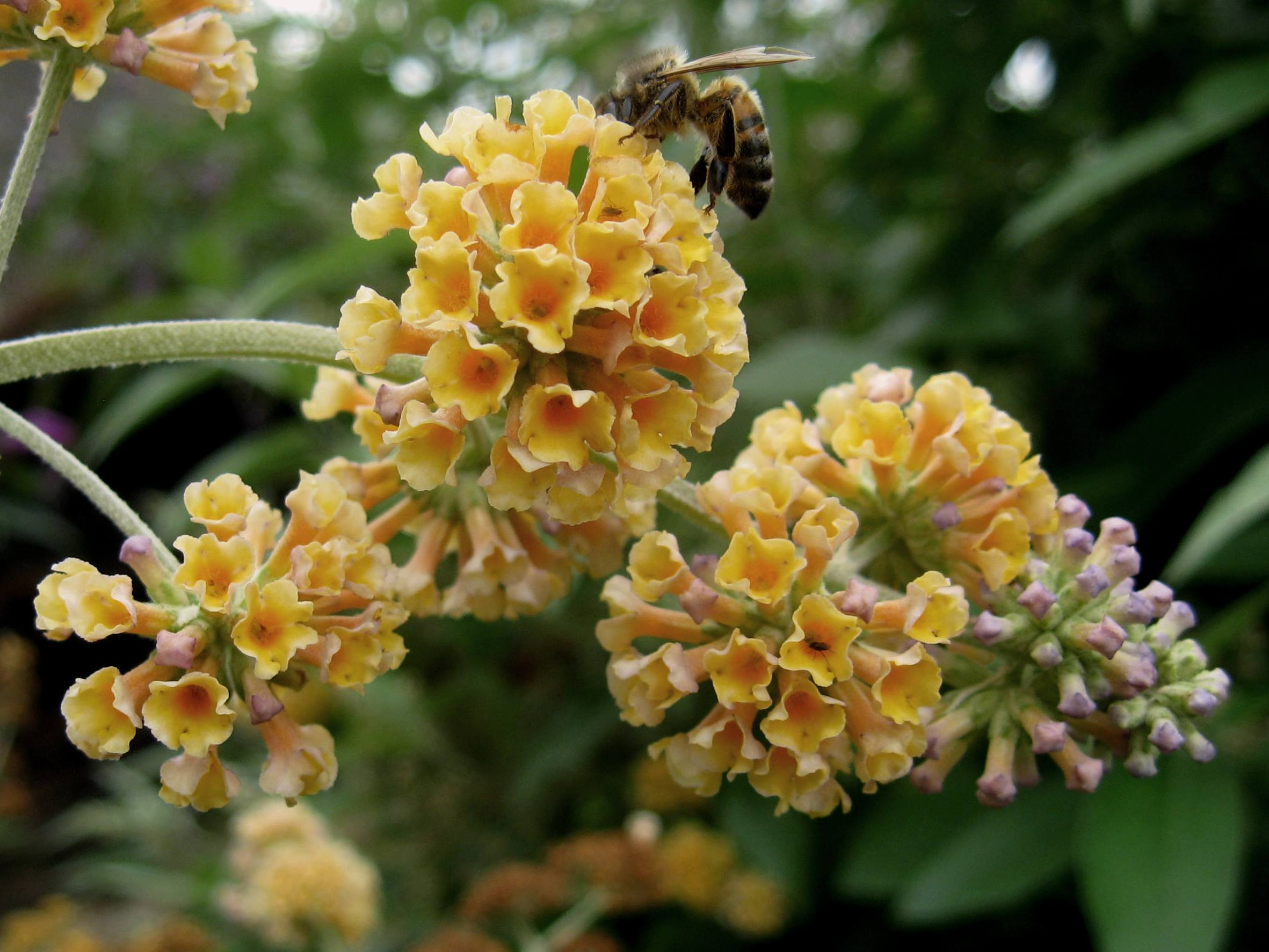
Buddleja × weyeriana 'Golden Glow'

Working in the nursery of his home, Smedmore House, Corfe Castle, he crossed B. globosa with B. davidii, naming the new hybrid Buddleja weyeriana. The initial F1 progeny were aesthetically poor, but Weyer persevered, back-crossing them to produce more strongly coloured F2 plants from which he made two selections he named 'Moonlight' and 'Golden Glow', which remain in commercial use to this day. Over half a century later, 'Sungold' was raised from a sport of 'Golden Glow' in the Netherlands, and was used in hybridization experiments in the USA, leading to the release of small, sterile Buddlejas such as 'Blue Chip'.

Weyer also hybridized B. globosa with B. madagascariensis circa 1920 and, several years later, B. globosa with B. brasiliensis, though neither appears to have had much horticultural merit and no cultivars are known.

== Career ==
Weyer was the son of Colonel Victor and Lady Emily van de Weyer (who was a daughter of William Craven, 2nd Earl of Craven), of New Lodge, Berkshire, and a grandson of Sylvain van de Weyer. Educated at Eton and the Royal Military College, Sandhurst, he joined the part-time 3rd (Royal Berkshire Militia) Battalion, Royal Berkshire Regiment – from which his father had recently retired as commanding officer – being commissioned as a Second lieutenant on 1 January 1890. He was promoted to Lieutenant on 7 February 1891 and to Captain on 13 May 1895.

Soon afterwards he was appointed as an aide de camp to the Lord Lieutenant of Ireland and later acted as his Military Secretary, for which services Weyer was awarded an MVO.

He retired from the militia on 3 May 1905 with the honorary rank of Major, and emigrated to Kenya, where he bought and managed a dairy farm 15 miles west of Nairobi. On the outbreak of World War I in 1914 he returned as a captain to his former battalion, which was training reinforcements for the Regular Army.

Weyer held the office of High Sheriff of Dorset in 1942.

== Personal life ==
Weyer married the Hon. Olive Elizabeth Wingfield (1885–1978), eldest daughter of Mervyn Wingfield, 7th Viscount Powerscourt, on 17 December 1908. They had five children, three daughters, Myrtle (1910-1997), Daphne (1911-2000), and Jasmine (1914-1968), and two sons, Sylvain (1917-1976) and Adrian (1919-1940), the latter killed in action in the Pas de Calais in 1940 aged 20. Major van de Weyer died on 1 April 1946, aged 75.

== Honours and arms ==
Weyer was invested as a Member of the Royal Victorian Order (MVO) in 1900. His hybrid buddleja cultivar 'Golden Glow' was accorded the Award of Merit by the Royal Horticultural Society in 1923.

Coat of arms of William John Bates van de Weyer
Escutcheon Gules, 3 fleurs de lis argent couped, accompanied in chief by a label of three points azure.

== Publications ==
Weyer, W. van de (1920). “Buddleja weyeriana” in Gardeners' Chronicle ser. 3, 68: 181. 1920.
