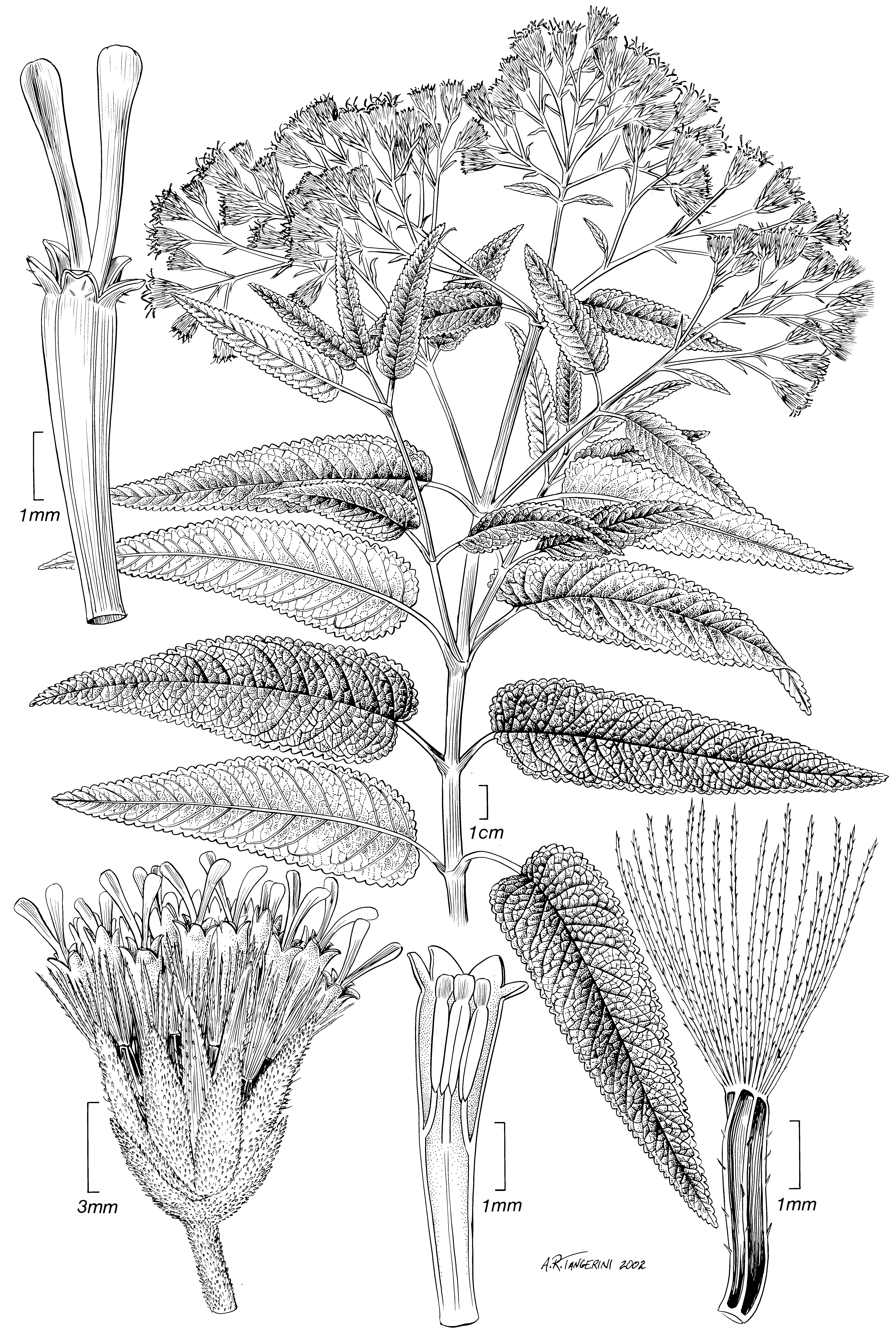
- Aristeguietia glutinosa (Lam.) R.M.King & H.Rob.

Conservation status
- Least Concern (IUCN 3.1)

Scientific classification
- Kingdom: Plantae
- Clade: Tracheophytes
- Clade: Angiosperms
- Clade: Eudicots
- Clade: Asterids
- Order: Asterales
- Family: Asteraceae
- Genus: Aristeguietia
- Species: A. glutinosa

Binomial name
- Aristeguietia glutinosa (Lam.) R.M.King & H.Rob.

= Aristeguietia glutinosa =

Species of flowering plant

Aristeguietia glutinosa is a species of flowering plant in the family Asteraceae. It is found only in Ecuador, where it is commonly called matico. In Peru, that name refers to the unrelated Piper aduncum, in Chile and Argentina the name matico is used for Buddleja globosa.

Its natural habitats are subtropical or tropical moist montane forests and subtropical or tropical high-altitude shrubland. It is threatened by habitat loss.

It has antibacterial, antiseptic, anti-inflammatory properties.
