= Guy Trouveroy =

Belgian diplomat

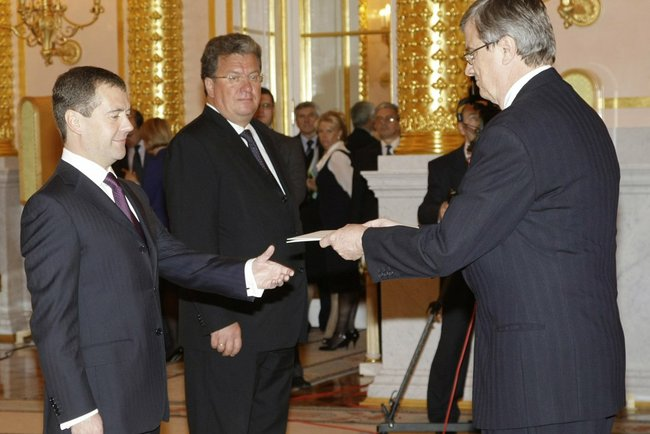
Trouveroy presenting his credentials to Dmitry Medvedev in October 2009.

Guy Trouveroy is a Belgian diplomat and was, from 2014 to July 2017, the ambassador to the United Kingdom, replacing Johan Verbeke.

Trouveroy was previously the ambassador of Belgium to Russia, presenting his credentials to Russian president Dmitry Medvedev on 12 October 2009.

Diplomatic posts
Preceded by Bertand de Crombrugghe	Belgian Ambassador to Russia; 2009–2014	Succeeded by Alex Van Meeuwen
Preceded by Johan Verbeke	Belgian Ambassador to the United Kingdom; 2014–2017	Succeeded by Rudolf Huygelen
