= Buddleja cestriflora =

Scientific classification
- Kingdom: Plantae
- Clade: Embryophytes
- Clade: Tracheophytes
- Clade: Spermatophytes
- Clade: Angiosperms
- Clade: Eudicots
- Clade: Asterids
- Order: Lamiales
- Family: Scrophulariaceae
- Genus: Buddleja
- Species: B. cestriflora

Binomial name
- Buddleja cestriflora Cham.

Species of flowering plant

Buddleja cestriflora is a rare species endemic to a small area near the eastern coast of Brazil, where it grows in the cloud forest along roadsides and in wet rocky clearings on the eastern border of Serra Geral of Santa Catarina and Rio Grande do Sul. The species was first described and named by Chamisso in 1833.

== Description ==
Buddleja cestriflora is a shrub 1–2 m high, with young branches which are subquadrangular and tomentose. The membranaceous leaves are narrowly lanceolate, 7–19 cm long by 2–4 cm wide, with a tomentulose to glabrescent upper surface, lanose below. The orange inflorescences are 10–25 cm long by 7–20 cm wide on one or two orders of branches bearing paired cymes, each with 6–12 flowers; the corolla tubes are 27–40 mm long.

The species is very similar to B. grandiflora and B. tubiflora.

== Cultivation ==
The shrub is not known to be in cultivation.
