= Robert Rothschild =

Belgian diplomat

His Excellency The Baron Rothschild KCMG
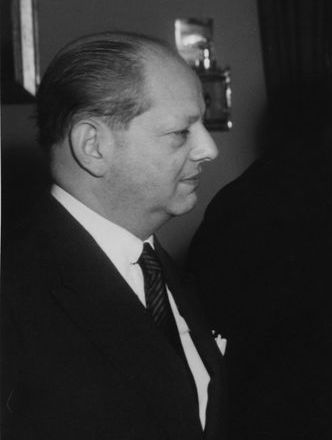
- Baron Rothschild, 20 November 1961

Belgian Ambassador to the United Kingdom
- In office 1973–1976
- Preceded by: Jean van den Bosch
- Succeeded by: Robert Vaes

Belgian Ambassador to France
- In office 1966–1973
- Preceded by: Marcel-Henri Jaspar
- Succeeded by: Charles de Kerchove de Denterghem

Personal details
- Born: 16 December 1911 Brussels, Belgium
- Died: 3 December 1998 (aged 86) London, England
- Spouse(s): Renée Marcelle Mattman (m. 1937; div. 1967) Mary Plunkett-Ernle-Erle-Drax (m. 1978; died 1998)
- Parent(s): Bernhard Rothschild; Marianne Elisabeth Rijnveld
- Education: Université libre de Bruxelles

Baron Robert Rothschild (16 December 1911 – 3 December 1998) was a Belgian diplomat. He helped to draft the Treaty of Rome of 1957, the foundation of the European Economic Community (EEC) in 1958.

== Early life ==
Rothschild was born on 16 December 1911, in Brussels. He was the son of Bernhard Rothschild (1884–1964) and Marianne Elisabeth (née Rijnveld) Rothschild and his brother was Marcel Rothschild. His father, a businessman of German-Jewish descent, descended from Moses Amschel Bauer, of Frankfurt am Main, whose son Mayer Amschel Rothschild, together with his five sons, founded the Rothschild banking dynasty. His paternal grandparents were Sybille (née Stiel) Rothschild and David Rothschild.

He attended the Université libre de Bruxelles in Brussels.

== Career ==
Rothschild's father was a friend of Paul Spaak, whose son, Paul-Henri Spaak, became Foreign Minister of Belgium in 1936. Robert passed the diplomatic service examination in 1936, and joined the private office of Paul-Henri Spaak in April 1937.

=== World War II ===
As an officer in the Belgian Army reserve on the outbreak of World War II, Robert Rothschild returned to his regiment and his brother Marcel started his service at the Brigade Piron. In May 1940, he was captured by the Germans and sent to Colditz Castle as a Prisoner of war. In 1941, he was sent back to Brussels and released. With the help of underground organizations and the Special Operations Executive, he escaped to Vichy France. He obtained an exit visa from a pro-Belgian French official and travelled to neutral Spain. He made his way to London to join the Belgian government in exile of Hubert Pierlot, which posted him to the diplomatic legation in Lisbon (Portugal). Lisbon was crawling with spies, all of whom knew one another's identity. They lunched at the same restaurants, peering at one another over their menus.

Robert remained in Lisbon until 1944, when he was sent, at his request to China. He became first secretary at the Belgian embassy in Chungking, the headquarters of Chiang Kai-shek's government. During the Japanese occupation, there was a lull in the Chinese Civil War. The Communists of Mao Zedong even had an envoy in Chungking in the person of Zhou Enlai, whom he grew to like.

=== Post-war diplomatic career ===
After the Japanese surrender, he flew to Shanghai, where, in 1946, he was appointed consul general. The Chinese civil war revived and in 1949 the Communists entered Shanghai. Under pressure from the French, who hoped to protect their interests in Indochina, Belgium declined to recognise the People's Republic of China for the next 20 years. He considered this a political mistake and regretted the failure to comprehend the rivalry between Soviet and Chinese Communism.

In early 1950, he left Shanghai for Washington, D.C. as second counsellor at the Belgian embassy. It was the time of the Korean War and the build-up of NATO and after two years in Washington, Robert went to Paris as a Belgian representative on the council of NATO.

In 1954, Rothschild was appointed chef de cabinet of Paul-Henri Spaak at the Belgian foreign ministry. For the next two years, he worked together with Spaak and Jean Charles Snoy et d'Oppuers on the Treaty of Rome (which brought about the creation of the European Economic Community) before the final signing of the treaty in 1957. Shortly before the treaty was signed, Rothschild was standing beside Spaak gazing over the Forum Romanum in Rome, when Spaak said "I think that we have re-established the Roman Empire without a single shot being fired."

Robert was due to join the Belgian delegation at NATO after the summit conference in Paris in 1960, between Nikita Khrushchev and Dwight D. Eisenhower. But, because of the Lockheed U-2 spy plane crisis, the conference was a failure and, so, Rothschild was sent to the Belgian Congo as number two to the governor. He arrived in Leopoldville (now Kinshasa) two days after the rebellion by the constabulary, egged on by the Pan-Africanist Congolese independence leader, Patrice Lumumba. After the independence of the Congo from Belgium in 1960, Katanga, the richest of the six provinces of the Belgian Congo seceded on 11 July, and the Belgians decided to move to Elisabethville (now Lubumbashi) in Katanga. While in Katanga, Rothschild had to steer his way delicately between Moise Tshombe the Rightist Katangan leader, who wanted Belgian support for the independence of the State of Katanga and Belgium, which was reluctant to grant it.

=== Ambassador to Switzerland, France, and the United Kingdom ===
After two years as ambassador to Switzerland, where in 1966, he was president of the executive committee of the General Agreement on Tariffs and Trade, he went as ambassador to Paris. He was close to the French civil servant Jean Monnet, one of the founding fathers of the European Union. In 1973, he was appointed ambassador in London, where he remained until 1976, and then lived in London for the rest of his life.

== Personal life ==
In 1937, Rothschild was married to Renée Marcelle Mattman. They divorced in 1967 and he married Mary (née Plunkett-Ernle-Erle-Drax) Hollond (1925–2017), former wife of Robert Gustaf Percy Hollond (a son of Maj.-Gen. Spencer Edmund Hollond), and daughter of Admiral Sir Reginald Plunkett-Ernle-Erle-Drax, on 24 May 1978.

Rothschild died in London on 3 December 1998.

== Honours ==
- United Kingdom: Knight Commander of the Order of St Michael and St George (1963)
- Belgium: Grand Officer, Order of Leopold
