= Johan Verbeke =

Belgian diplomat

- Born: 9 July 1951 (age 74); Ghent
- Occupation: Diplomat
- Known for: UN Observer Mission in Georgia (UNOMIG)

Johan Verbeke (born 9 July 1951) is a Belgian diplomat, the former Belgian Ambassador to the United States until 2016.

== Early life ==
Verbeke holds a Master of Laws (LL.M.) from the Yale Law School and a Diplôme d’Etudes Supérieures Européennes (D.E.S.) from the Université de Nancy.

== Career ==
Verbeke joined the Belgian Ministry of Foreign Affairs in 1981 and has served in various capacities for his country's foreign service, including as Chairman of the Security Council Sanctions Committees on Côte d'Ivoire, Iran and Al Qaida/Taliban, leader of the Security Council Mission to Kosovo (April 2007), Facilitator of the President of the General Assembly for the negotiation of General Assembly-resolutions on Millennium Development Goals-implementation and Economic and Social Council-reform (2005–2006), Personal Representative of the Minister of Foreign Affairs for Counter-Terrorism (2003), Special Envoy of the Prime Minister to the New Partnership for Africa's Development (NEPAD) (2002–2005). Verbeke worked in the Ministry as the Deputy Director General for Political Affairs and as the Deputy Chief of Mission in Washington, D.C. Since then, he was the Chef de Cabinet of the Ministry of Foreign Affairs.

Verbeke was the permanent representative of Belgium to the United Nations and to its Security Council. He was briefly the UN special coordinator for Lebanon, serving as the United Nations Secretary General's representative in Lebanon. When he served as Permanent Representative of Belgium to the United Nations, he presented his credentials to the United Nations Secretary-General on 16 September 2004. Later, Verbeke was the Secretary-General's Special Representative and Head of the UN Observer Mission in Georgia (UNOMIG) in 2008–09.

From 2010 until 2014, Verbeke was the Belgian Ambassador to the United Kingdom.

From 2014 to 2015, Johan Verbeke was the Belgian Ambassador to the United States in Washington, D.C. Afterwards, he became the director general of the think tank Egmont Institute.

== Bibliography ==
- Verbeke, Johan (2022). Diplomacy in Practice: A Critical Approach. Taylor & Francis. ISBN 9781000630367.
- Verbeke, Johan (2022). Diplomatic Skills. The Basics. ASP. ISBN 9789461173249.

== Offices held ==
Diplomatic posts
Preceded by Jean-Michel Veranneman de Watervliet	Belgian Ambassador to the United Kingdom; 2010–2014	Succeeded by Guy Trouveroy
Preceded by Jan Matthysen	Belgian Ambassador to the United States; 2014–2016	Succeeded by Dirk Wouters
