= Sylvain Van de Weyer =

Belgian politician

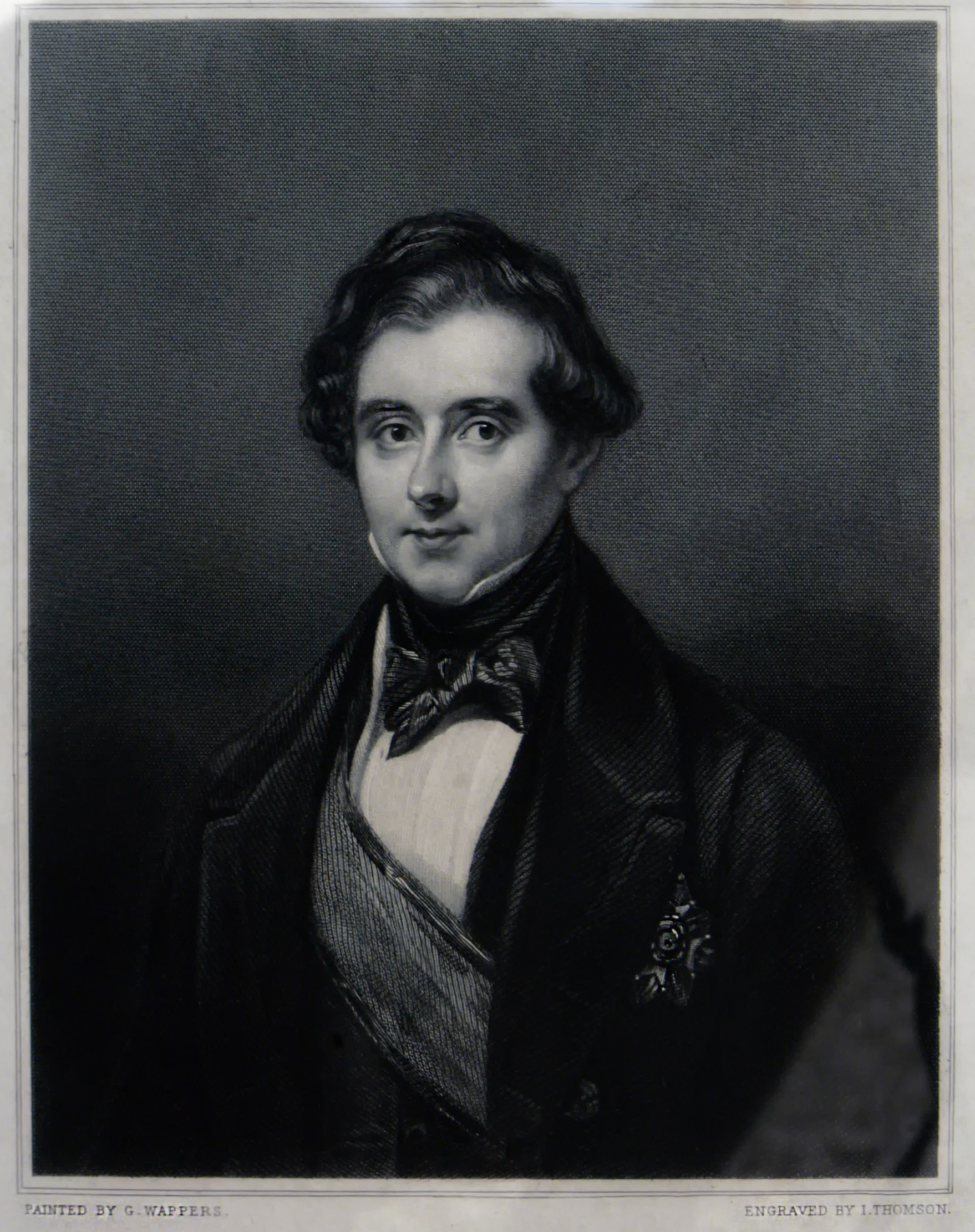

Prime Minister of Belgium
- In office 30 July 1845 – 31 March 1846
- Monarch: Leopold I
- Preceded by: Jean-Baptiste Nothomb
- Succeeded by: Barthélémy de Theux de Meylandt

Belgian Ambassador to the United Kingdom of Great Britain and Ireland
- In office 1831–1867
- Monarchs: Leopold I, Leopold II; William IV, Queen Victoria

Personal details
- Born: 19 January 1802 Louvain, France (now Belgium)
- Died: 23 May 1874 (aged 72) London, United Kingdom
- Party: Liberal Party
- Spouse: Elizabeth Anne Sturgis Bates (1839–1874)
- Education: State University of Leuven

Jean-Sylvain Van de Weyer (19 January 1802 – 23 May 1874) was a British–Belgian politician who served as the Belgian Minister at the Court of St. James's, effectively the ambassador to the United Kingdom, and briefly, as the prime minister of Belgium, all under King Leopold I.

== Early life ==
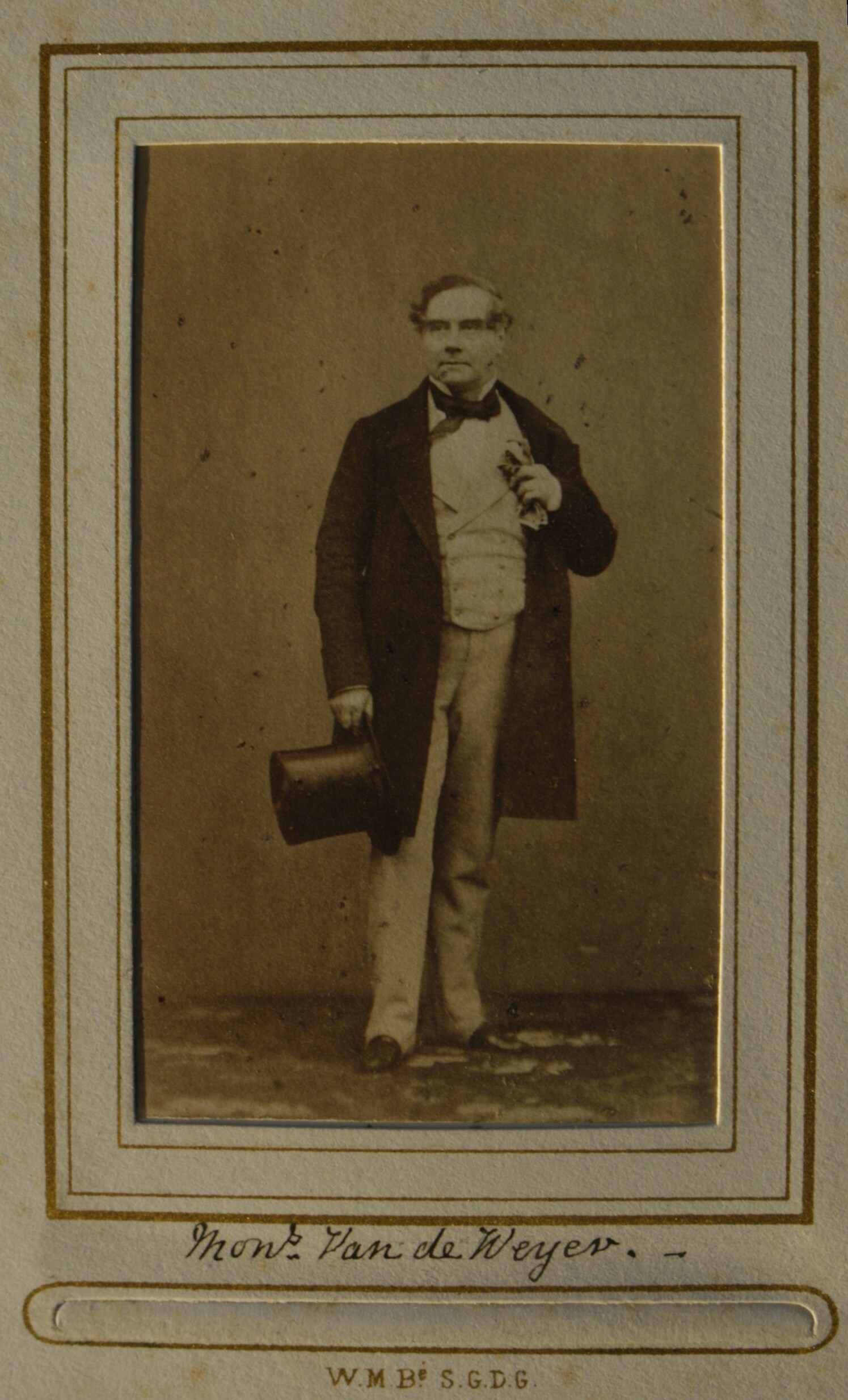
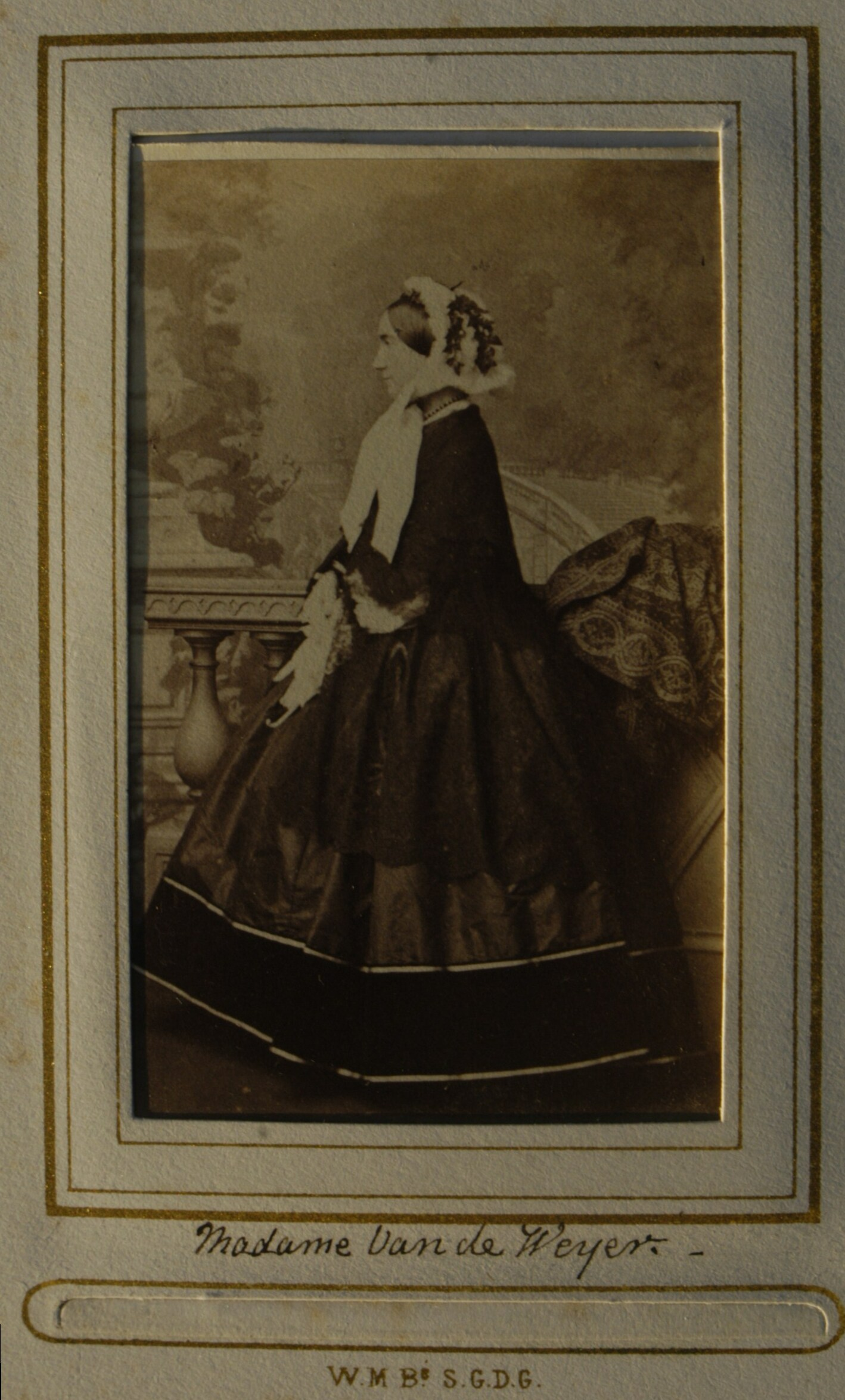
_{Monsr. & Madame Van de Weyer, in the 1860s.}

Van de Weyer was born in Louvain on 19 January 1802. He was the son of Josse-Alexandre Van de Weyer (1769–1838) and Françoise Martine (née Goubau) Van de Weyer (1780–1853). He was the grandson of Jean-Baptiste (or Jean-Sylvain) Van de Weyer, who was from a bourgeois family of Bautersem, and Josse Goubeau, commissaire de police de la quatrième section de Bruxelles.

In 1811, his family relocated to Amsterdam. The family returned to Louvain when his father was named police commissioner for the city. Jean-Sylvain studied law at the State University of Louvain and set up as a lawyer in Brussels in 1823.

== Career ==
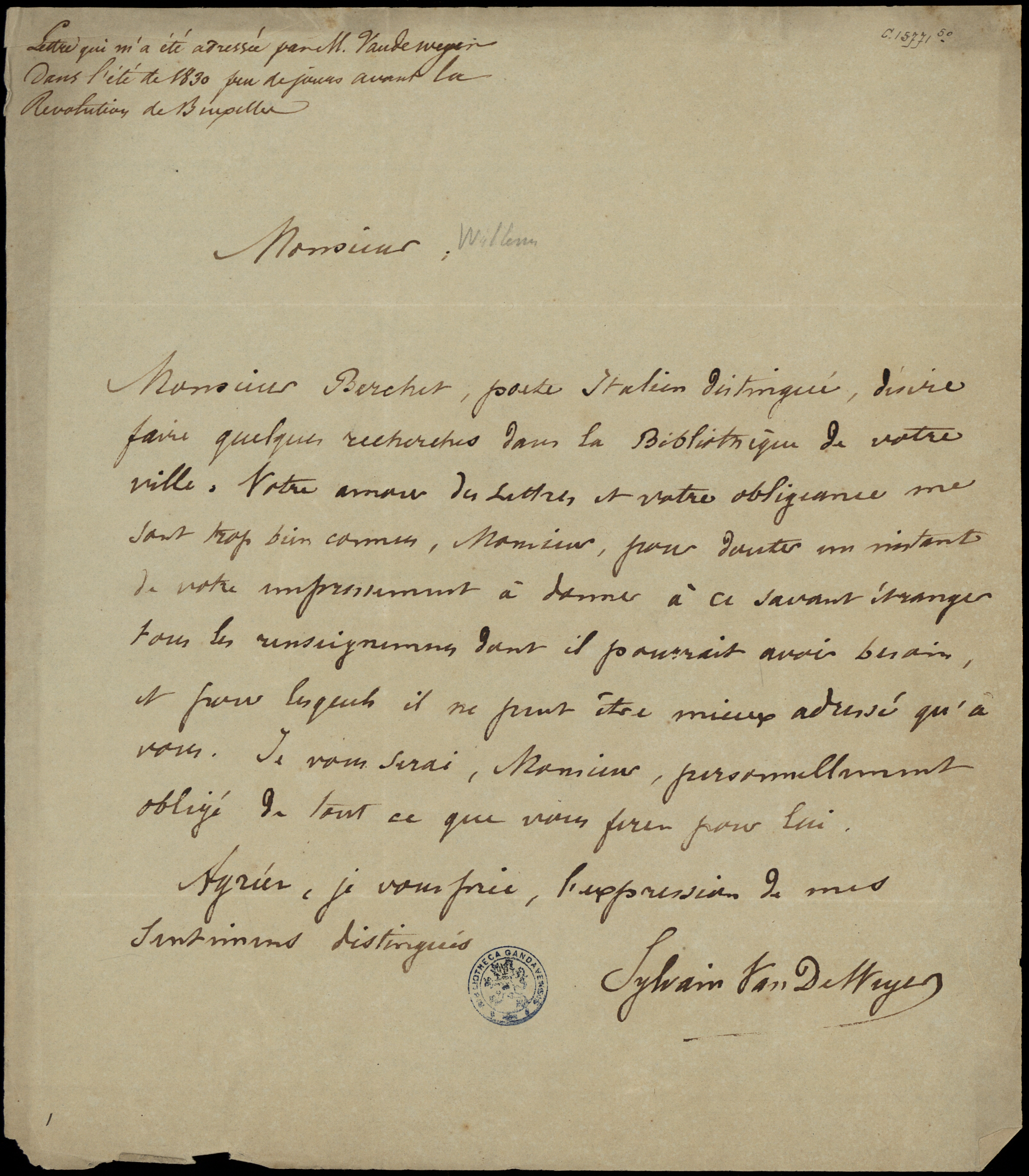
Letter from Van de Weyer to Jan Frans Willems (1830)

As a lawyer, he frequently defended newspapers and journalists that had fallen foul of the government of the United Kingdom of the Netherlands, of which modern Belgium then formed the southern half.

On the outbreak of the Belgian Revolution in 1830, Van de Weyer was in Louvain, but hurried to Brussels where he became a member of the central committee of the Provisional Government of Belgium. His command of the English language resulted in his serving as a diplomatic representative of the revolutionaries. In 1831, King Leopold I appointed Van de Weyer his "special representative" in London. The King at the time was William IV, who reigned from 1830 to 1837, when his niece became Queen Victoria who reigned until January 1901. During his tenure as Minister in London, Van de Weyer became a "beloved and honoured friend of the royal family," as was his wife, who became close to the Queen and comforted her after the death of Albert, Prince Consort.

Van de Weyer later served as the 8th Prime Minister of Belgium, succeeding Jean-Baptiste Nothomb. He was vice-president of the London Library from 1848 till his death in 1874.

He was a founding member of the first Société des douze.

== Personal life ==
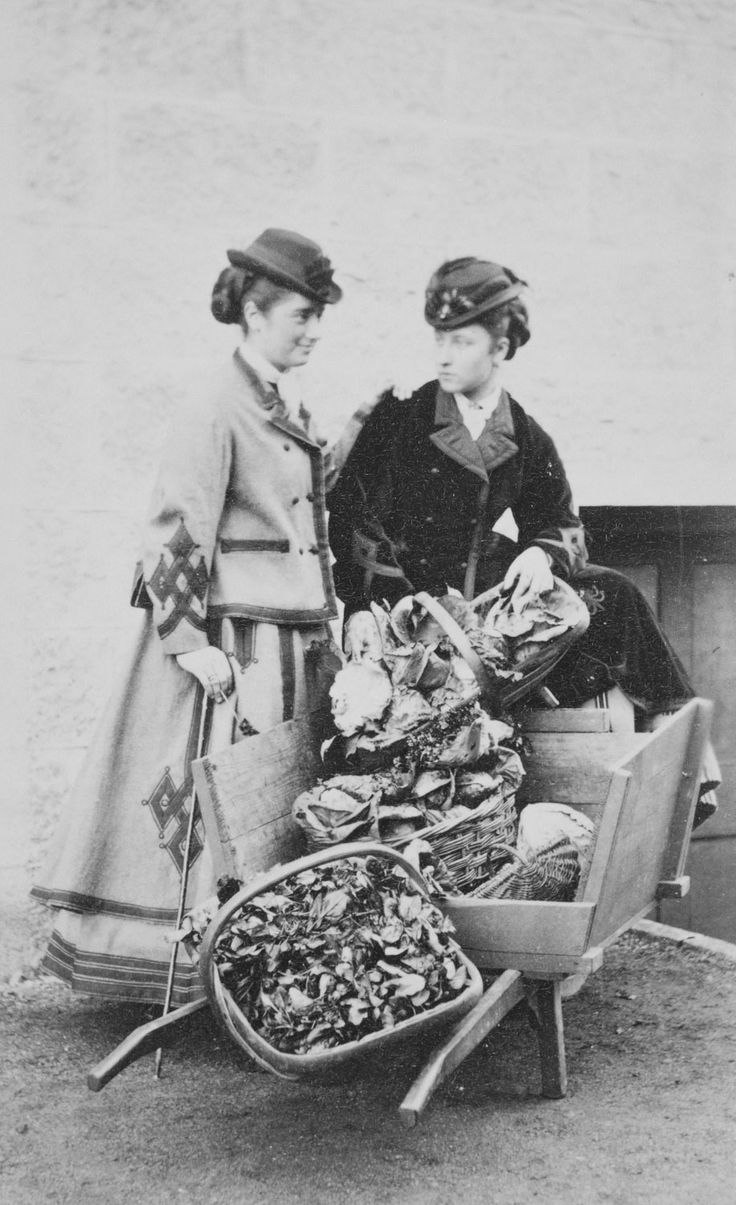
Princess Louise (1848–1939) and Sylvain's daughter Louise (died 1896), by James Valentine (1815–1879), circa 1866–1870.

On 12 February 1839, he married Elizabeth Anne Sturgis Bates (1817–1878), the only daughter of Joshua Bates of Barings Bank, and formerly of Boston. She had a brother, William Rufus Gray Bates, who died at a young age. Together, they had two sons and five daughters, who were brought up in Marylebone and on their country estate, New Lodge, in the parish of Winkfield in Berkshire:

- Lt. Colonel Victor William Bates Van de Weyer (1839–1915), educated at Eton, married to Lady Emily Georgiana (1846–1932), daughter of William Craven, 2nd Earl of Craven.
- Victoria Alexandrina Leopoldine van de Weyer (1841–1865), married to Henry Brand, 2nd Viscount Hampden (1841–1906) on 21 January 1864.
- Albert Sylvain Bates Van de Weyer (1845–1874), an Adjutant in the Grenadier Guards.
- Evelyn Elizabeth Sturgis Van de Weyer (1847–1853), who died young.
- Louise Van de Weyer (died 1896), a friend of Princess Louise, daughter of Queen Victoria.
- Alice Emma Sturgis Van de Weyer (1856–1926), who married Maj. Hon. Charles Brand (1855–1912), fourth son of Henry Brand, 1st Viscount Hampden, on 15 August 1878.
- Eleanor Van de Weyer (1865–1940), who married Reginald Brett, 2nd Viscount Esher (1852–1930), a British MP for Penryn and Falmouth, in 1879.

Van de Weyer died on 23 May 1874 in London, England.

=== Descendants ===
Through his son Victor, he was the grandfather of Major William John Bates van de Weyer (1870–1946), who was responsible for Buddleja × weyeriana. William married Hon. Olive Elizabeth Wingfield, eldest daughter of Mervyn Wingfield, 7th Viscount Powerscourt.

Through his daughter Alice, he was the grandfather of Ruth Brand (d. 1967), who married John Dodson, 2nd Baron Monk Bretton (parents of John Dodson, 3rd Baron Monk Bretton); Lt.-Col. John Charles Brand (1885–1929), who married Lady Rosabelle Millicent St. Clair-Erskine, the daughter of James St Clair-Erskine, 5th Earl of Rosslyn.

Through his youngest daughter, he was the grandfather of Oliver Sylvain Baliol Brett, 3rd Viscount Esher (1881–1963); Maurice Vyner Baliol Brett (1882–1934), who married the famous musical theatre actress Zena Dare; Dorothy Brett (1883–1977), who was a painter and member of the Bloomsbury Group; and Sylvia Brett (1885–1971), who became the last Ranee of Sarawak on 24 May 1917, following the proclamation of her husband Charles Vyner Brooke as Rajah.

== Honours and arms ==
- Belgium: Croix de Fer.
- Belgium: Minister of State, By Royal Decree.
- Belgium: Grand Cordon in the Order of Leopold.
- Kingdom of Italy: Knight Grand Cross in the Order of Saints Maurice and Lazarus.
- Spain: Knight Grand Cross in the Order of Charles III.
- Kingdom of Portugal: Knight Grand Cross in the Order of the Tower and Sword.
- Saxe-Coburg and Gotha: Knight Grand Cross in the Saxe-Ernestine House Order.
- France: Commander of the Legion of Honour.
  Coat of arms of Sylvain Van de Weyer
  Escutcheon Gules, 3 fleurs de lis argent couped, accompanied in chief by a label of three points azure.

== Bibliography ==
- J. BARTELOUS, Nos premiers ministres de Léopold Ier à Albert Ier 1831–1934, Bruxelles, Collet, 1983.

Political offices
Preceded by Jean-Baptiste Nothomb	Prime Minister of Belgium; 1845–1846	Succeeded by Barthélémy de Theux de Meylandt
