= Aristeguietia gayana =

Scientific classification
- Kingdom: Plantae
- Clade: Tracheophytes
- Clade: Angiosperms
- Clade: Eudicots
- Clade: Asterids
- Order: Asterales
- Family: Asteraceae
- Genus: Aristeguietia
- Species: A. gayana

Binomial name
- Aristeguietia gayana (Wedd.) R.M. King & H. Rob.

Synonyms
- Eupatorium gayanum Wedd.

Species of plant

Aristeguietia gayana, or asmachilca, is a bush that grows up to 1 meter in height. It grows in the west-facing mountainsides and interandean valleys between 3600 and 4000 meters in altitude.

Asmachilca is only found in Peru. It was traditionally used by the Incas for respiratory system complaints. Today, it is used in cooking, but tea is the most common preparation.
