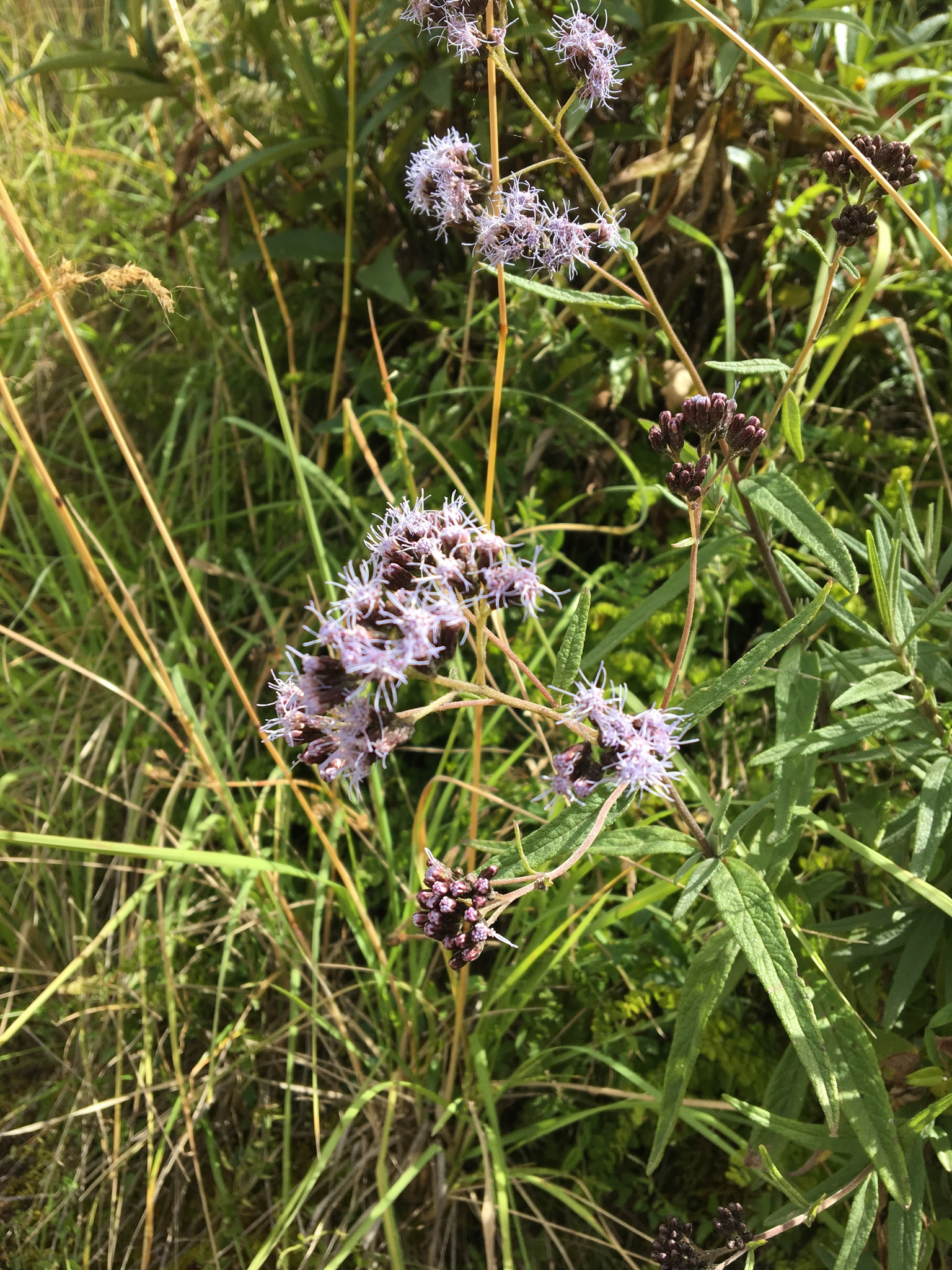
- Near Cusco, Peru

Conservation status
- Near Threatened (IUCN 2.3)

Scientific classification
- Kingdom: Plantae
- Clade: Tracheophytes
- Clade: Angiosperms
- Clade: Eudicots
- Clade: Asterids
- Order: Asterales
- Family: Asteraceae
- Genus: Aristeguietia
- Species: A. discolor

Binomial name
- Aristeguietia discolor R.M.King & H.Rob.

= Aristeguietia discolor =

Species of plant

Aristeguietia discolor is a species of flowering plant in the family Asteraceae. It is found only in Peru. The plant contains flavonol glycosides that can reduce the effects of morphine withdrawal.
