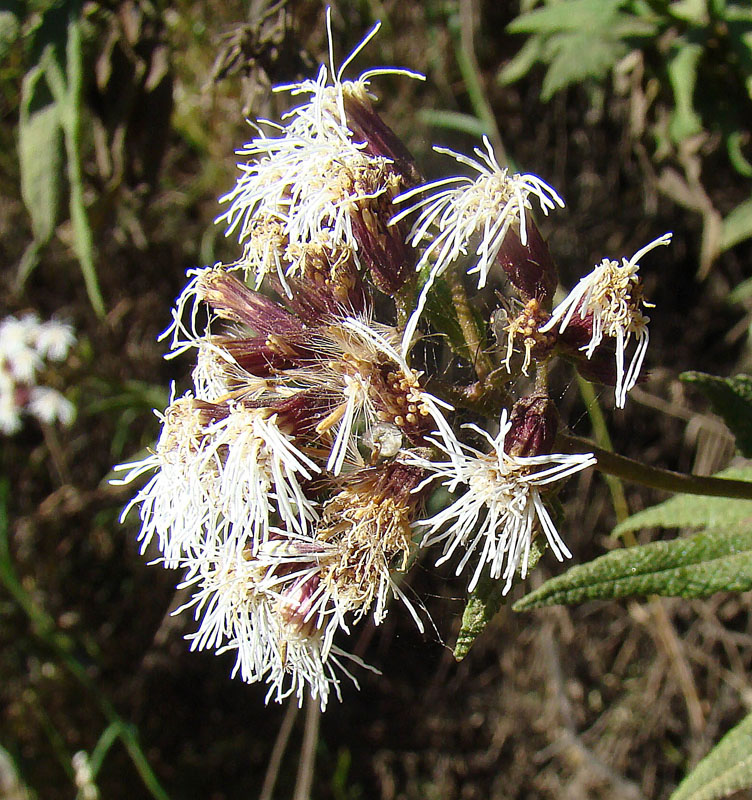
- Aristeguietia salvia

Scientific classification
- Kingdom: Plantae
- Clade: Embryophytes
- Clade: Tracheophytes
- Clade: Spermatophytes
- Clade: Angiosperms
- Clade: Eudicots
- Clade: Asterids
- Order: Asterales
- Family: Asteraceae
- Subfamily: Asteroideae
- Tribe: Eupatorieae
- Genus: Aristeguietia; R.M.King & H.Rob

= Aristeguietia =

Genus of flowering plants

Aristeguietia is a genus of about 21 species of flowering plants in the tribe Eupatorieae of the family Asteraceae. It is found from Colombia to southern Peru, with one species in Chile.

Species

- Aristeguietia arborea (Kunth) R.M.King & H.Rob.
- Aristeguietia ballii (Oliv.) R.M.King & H.Rob.
- Aristeguietia buddleaefolia (Benth.) R.M.King & H.Rob.
- Aristeguietia buddleifolia (Benth.) R.M.King & H.Rob.
- Aristeguietia cacalioides (Kunth) R.M.King & H.Rob.
- Aristeguietia chimborazensis (Hieron.) R.M.King & H.Rob.
- Aristeguietia cursonii (B.L.Rob.) R.M.King & H.Rob.
- Aristeguietia dielsii (B.L.Rob.) R.M.King & H.Rob.
- Aristeguietia diplodictyon (B.L.Rob.) R.M.King & H.Rob.
- Aristeguietia discolor (DC.) R.M.King & H.Rob.
- Aristeguietia gascae (B.L.Rob.) R.M.King & H.Rob.
- Aristeguietia gayana (Wedd.) R.M.King & H.Rob.
- Aristeguietia glutinosa (Lam.) R.M.King & H.Rob.
- Aristeguietia lamiifolia (Kunth) R.M.King & H.Rob.
- Aristeguietia persicifolia (Kunth) R.M.King & H.Rob.
- Aristeguietia pseudarborea (Hieron.) R.M.King & H.Rob.
- Aristeguietia salvia (Colla) R.M.King & H.Rob.
- Aristeguietia tahonensis (Hieron.) R.M.King & H.Rob.
- Aristeguietia tatamensis (B.L.Rob.) R.M.King & H.Rob.
- Aristeguietia uribei R.M.King & H.Rob.
