= List of ambassadors of Belgium to France =

List of Belgian Ambassadors to France

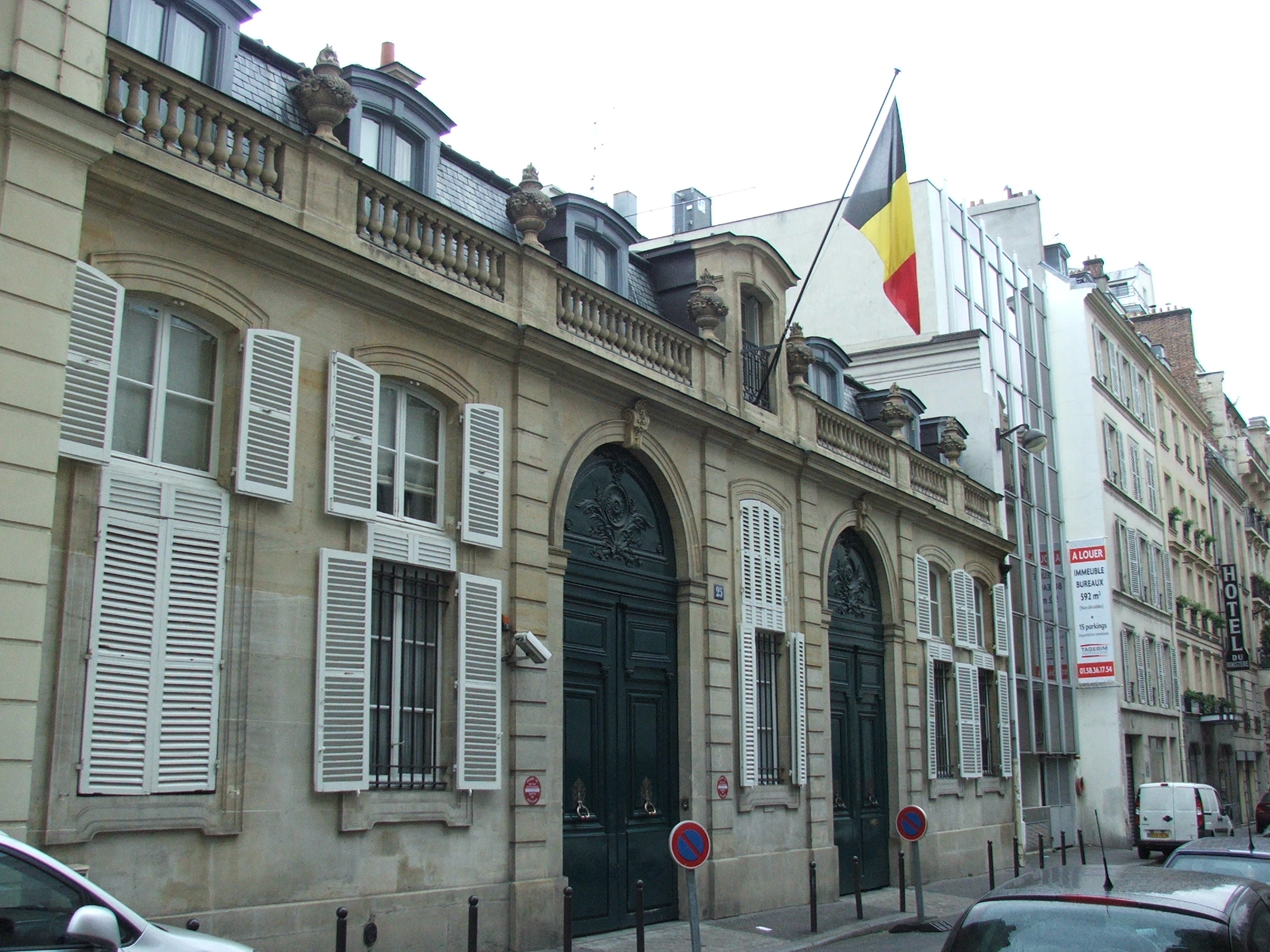
Hôtel de La Marck, residence of the Ambassador

This is a list of ambassadors from Belgium to France, who head the Embassy of Belgium, Paris. Formally, they are the Ambassador of His Majesty the King of the Belgians to the French government.

== History ==
Apart from Prince Eugène de Ligne, who was Ambassador from 1842 to 1848, the diplomatic representatives of Belgium bore the title of "Envoy Extraordinary and Minister Plenipotentiary" until 15 July 1919, when the post was elevated to an Ambassadorship.

The embassy is located at the Hôtel de La Marck, a private mansion at 25, rue de Surène in the 8th arrondissement of Paris.

== Heads of Mission ==
=== Minister Plenipotentiary (1831–1919) ===
Appointment	Departure	Ambassador	King	Sent to	Note
1831	1842	Charles Le Hon	Leopold I	Louis Philippe I	Envoy Extraordinary and Minister Plenipotentiary. Count
1842	1848	Eugène de Ligne	Leopold I	Louis Philippe I	Ambassador Extraordinary. Prince
1848	1864	Firmin Rogier	Leopold I	Louis Philippe I	Envoy Extraordinary and Minister Plenipotentiary
1864	1894	Eugène Beyens	Leopold I	Napoléon III	Envoy Extraordinary and Minister Plenipotentiary. Baron
1894	1903	Auguste d'Anethan	Leopold II	Émile Loubet	Envoy Extraordinary and Minister Plenipotentiary Knight
1904	1910	Alfred Leghait	Leopold II	Armand Fallières	Envoy Extraordinary and Minister Plenipotentiary Baron
1910	1916	Paul Guillaume	Albert I	Armand Fallières	Envoy Extraordinary and Minister Plenipotentiary Baron

=== Ambassadors (since 1919) ===
Appointment	Departure	Ambassador	King	Sent to	Note3
1916	1935	Edmond de Gaiffier d'Hestroy	Albert I	Raymond Poincaré	Director General of Politics from 1912 to 1916. Baron
1935	1938	André de Kerchove de Denterghem	Leopold III	Léon Blum	Count
1938	1941	Pol Le Tellier	Leopold III	Albert Lebrun	
1944	1959	Jules Guillaume	Prince Charles	Charles de Gaulle	Baron
1959	1966	Marcel-Henri Jaspar	Baudouin	Charles de Gaulle	
1966	1973	Robert Rothschild	Baudouin	Georges Pompidou	Baron
1973	1976	Charles de Kerchove de Denterghem	Baudouin	Georges Pompidou	Count
1976	1979	Werner de Merode	Baudouin	Valéry Giscard d'Estaing	Prince
1979	1984	Alexandre Paternotte de la Vaillée	Baudouin	Valéry Giscard d'Estaing	Baron
1985	1986	Eugène Rittweger de Moor	Baudouin	François Mitterrand	Baron
1986	1989	Luc Smolderen	Baudouin	François Mitterrand	
1989	1996	Alfred Cahen	Baudouin	François Mitterrand	
1996	2001	Alain Rens	Albert II	Jacques Chirac	
2001	2005	Pierre-Étienne Champenois	Albert II	Jacques Chirac	
2005	2007	Pierre-Dominique Schmidt	Albert II	Jacques Chirac	Recalled following alleged embezzlement
2007	2010	Baudouin de la Kethulle de Ryhove	Albert II	Nicolas Sarkozy	Knight
2010	2015	Patrick Vercauteren Drubbel	Albert II	Nicolas Sarkozy	
2015	2018	Vincent Mertens de Wilmars	Philippe	François Hollande	
2018	2023	François de Kerchove d'Exaerde	Philippe	Emmanuel Macron	
2023		Jo Indekeu	Philippe	Emmanuel Macron	

== Sources ==
- Alexandre Paternotte de la Vaillée (1981). L'Hôtel de la Marck: Ambassade de Belgique (in French). Berger-Levrault. ISBN 978-2-70130-468-7.
