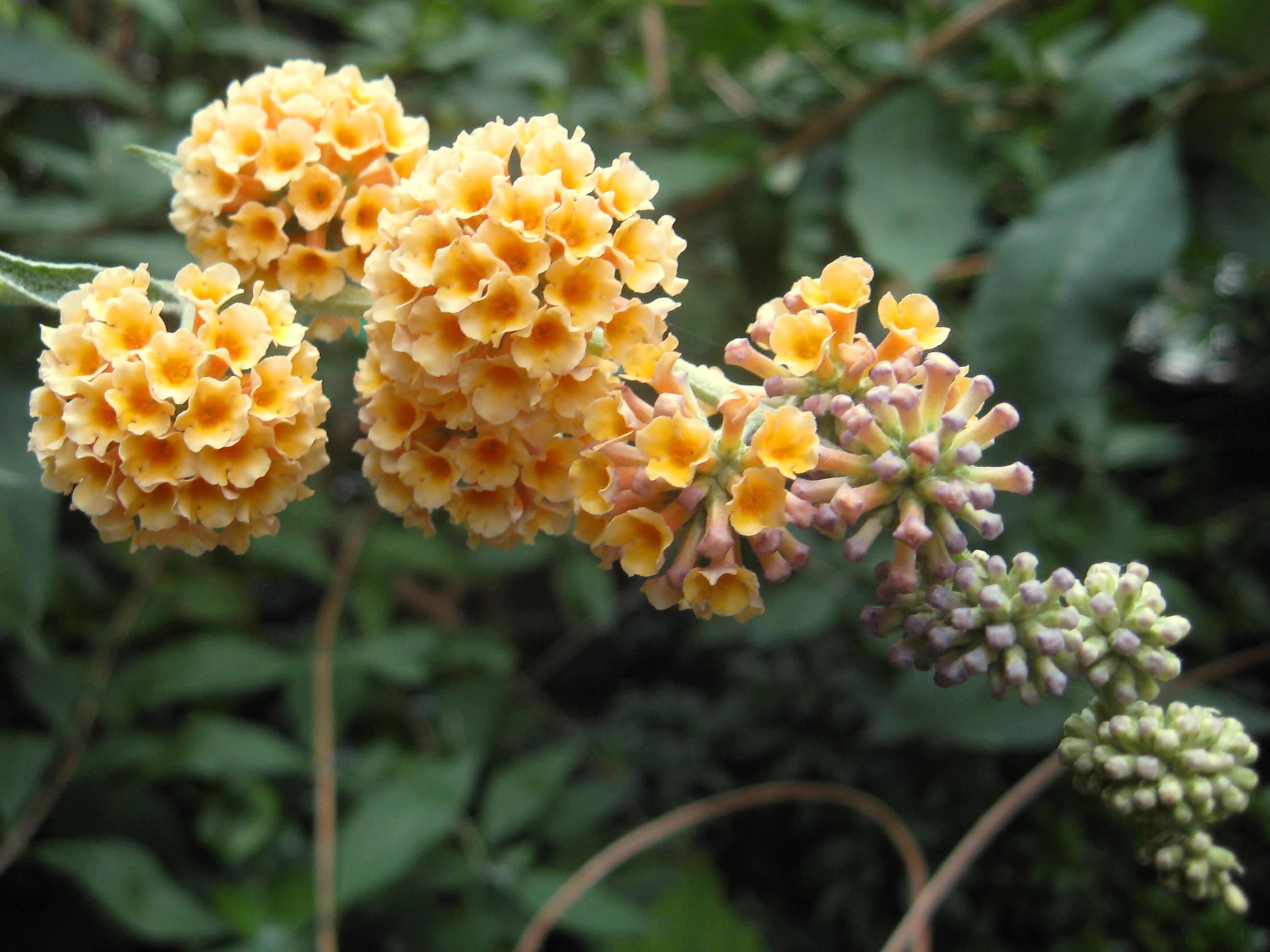

Scientific classification
- Kingdom: Plantae
- Clade: Tracheophytes
- Clade: Angiosperms
- Clade: Eudicots
- Clade: Asterids
- Order: Lamiales
- Family: Scrophulariaceae
- Genus: Buddleja
- Species: B. × weyeriana

Binomial name
- Buddleja × weyeriana Weyer ex Bean

= Buddleja × weyeriana =

Species of flowering plant

Buddleja × weyeriana is one of the more remarkable Buddleja hybrids, the first crossing of an Asiatic species (B. davidii) with a South American (B. globosa). The hybrid was raised during the First World War by the eponymous Major William van de Weyer at his home, Smedmore House, at Corfe Castle, England. Van de Weyer was hoping to achieve an inflorescence the size of davidii with the colour of globosa, but met with only limited success.

== Description ==
The F1 progeny of × weyeriana was a disappointment, the inflorescences small and the colours drab. Van de Weyer rightly deduced the colour was a function of a recessive trait, and reputedly crossed the F1 plants to raise the superior F2 cultivars 'Golden Glow' and 'Moonlight', although both retained vestiges of the lilac colouring of davidii. However, Moore considered it more likely the cultivars arose from backcrossing the F1 hybrids with B. globosa. The hybrid's nectar is relatively complex, comprising three constituents in almost equal proportions: sucrose, fructose, and glucose, whereas the nectar of the common Buddleja davidii is almost exclusively sucrose.

It was not until half a century later that the colour objective was realized, when a Dutch nursery cloned a pure orange-yellow sport of 'Golden Glow' to produce 'Sungold'. An inflorescence the size of davidii with this desired colour remains (2014) elusive. Ploidy: 2n = 76.

== Cultivation ==
Buddleja × weyeriana 'Golden Glow' is the original plant of van de Weyer exhibited in 1920. A specimen is grown as part of the NCCPG national collection held by the Longstock Park Nursery. together with the cultivars 'Sungold', 'Moonlight', and Buddleja × weyeriana 'Variegata'. The authenticity of the other cultivars remains a matter of contention.
