= Jean van den Bosch =

Belgian diplomat

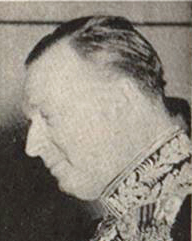
- Van den Bosch in the Congo in 1960

Belgian Ambassador to the Republic of the Congo (Léopoldville)

Baron
- In office 4 July 1960 – 9 August 1960
- Preceded by: position established

Personal details
- Born: 27 January 1910 Ghent, Belgium
- Died: 15 December 1985 (aged 75)
- Spouse: Hélène van den Bosch
- Education: Catholic University of Leuven

Jean van den Bosch (27 January 1910 – 15 December 1985) was a Belgian diplomat.

== Biography ==
Jean van den Bosch was born on 27 January 1910 in Ghent, Belgium. He received a doctorate in law from the Université catholique de Louvain in 1931. The following year he earned degrees in history and diplomatic political science.

=== Career ===
Van den Bosch began his diplomatic career in 1934. On 2 July 1960 van den Bosch arrived in Léopoldville, capital of the newly independent Republic of the Congo (formerly the Belgian Congo) to serve as ambassador. Two days later he presented his credentials to President Joseph Kasa-Vubu. In the subsequent Congo Crisis, Van den Bosch wanted to avoid a total administrative collapse and worked to ensure the retention of Belgian personnel in the civil service. In doing so he established contacts with ONUC, Congolese ministers in favor of a strong relationship with Belgium, and certain ministries (namely Finance, Economic Affairs, and External Commerce). He also communicated with the remaining Belgian civil servants who were anxious about serving in an administration that had the disapproval of the Belgian government, advising those in the employment of moderate ministers or the Presidency to continue their work while cautioning those attached to the "extremists" to avoid any undertakings that would harm Belgian interests. Relations between Belgium and the Congo quickly deteriorated, however, and van den Bosch was accused by the Congolese government of instigating unrest throughout the country. He was ordered to be expelled from the Congo, but did not receive any notice until the morning of 9 August when a Congolese Foreign Ministry official informed him that he had until noon that day to leave. Facing a large crowd of angry Congolese, van den Bosch left the Belgian embassy under the escort of United Nations peacekeepers to the docks, where he took a boat to Brazzaville and from there flew back to Belgium.
