= Buddleja stachyoides =

Scientific classification
- Kingdom: Plantae
- Clade: Embryophytes
- Clade: Tracheophytes
- Clade: Spermatophytes
- Clade: Angiosperms
- Clade: Eudicots
- Clade: Asterids
- Order: Lamiales
- Family: Scrophulariaceae
- Genus: Buddleja
- Species: B. stachyoides

Binomial name
- Buddleja stachyoides Cham. & Schltdl.

Synonyms
- Buddleja alata Larañaga; Buddleja albotomentosa Jacq. ex Spreng.; Buddleja australis Vell.; Buddleja brasiliensis Jacq. ex Spreng.; Buddleja brasiliensis Jacq. ex Spreng. subsp. stachyoides (Cham. & Schltdl.) E. M. Norman & L. B. Sm.; Buddleja brasiliensis Jacq. ex Spreng. var. glazoviana Gilg; Buddleja neemda Link; Buddleja otophylla Hassk.

Species of flowering plant

Buddleja stachyoides is the most widespread member of the genus in South America, endemic to woodland edges, roadsides and riversides in Argentina, Brazil, Bolivia, Paraguay, and Uruguay. Introduced to the UK as B. australis in 1822, when the Royal Botanic Garden Edinburgh grew it from seed received from a Russian source, the plant was described and renamed B. stachyoides by Chamisso and von Schlechtendal in 1827.

== Description ==
Buddleja stachyoides is a shrub 1–3.5 m high. Unlike most South American members of the genus which are cryptically dioecious, stachyoides is hermaphroditic, bearing perfect flowers. The young branches are quadrangular, occasionally winged, and covered with a greyish tomentum, bearing leaves subsessile or with a petiole <1 cm, ovate or oblong-lanceolate, the blade 5–20 cm long by 3–8 cm wide, membranaceous, glabrescent above, and tomentose below. The yellow to pale orange inflorescence is unbranched, 10–20 cm long, comprising 4–20 pairs of axillary cymes; the tubular corolla is 5–7 mm long. Ploidy: 2n = 38.

== Cultivation ==
Buddleja stachyoides remains cultivated (under glass) in the UK at the Royal Botanic Gardens Kew, the Cambridge Botanic Garden, and as part of the NCCPG national collection at Longstock Park Nursery, near Stockbridge, Hampshire. Elsewhere, B. stachyoides has naturalized in Australia along a creek bank at Ashgrove near Brisbane, and on the islands of St Helena, and Réunion. Hardiness: USDA zones 9–11.
