= Raymond John Moore =

Canadian botanist (1918–1988)

Raymond John Moore (1918–1988) was a Canadian botanist best known for his researches into Buddleja hybridization at the Blandy Experimental Farm in Boyce, Virginia, USA, and later at the Canadian Department of Agriculture Plant Research Institute in Ottawa, where he specialized in cytogenetics.

== Publications ==
- Moore, R. J. (1949). Cytotaxonomic studies in the Loganiaceae. III Artificial hybrids in the genus Buddleia. L. Am. J. Bot. 36, 511–516. 1949.
- Moore, R. J. (1952). An interspecific hybrid in Buddleja. Journal of Heredity. Vol. 43, Issue 1, 41–44. Oxford University Press.
- Moore, R. J. (1960). Cytotaxonomic notes on Buddleia. L. Am. J. Bot. 47, 6, 511–517. 1960.
- Moore, R. J. (1961). Polyploidy, phylogeny and photoperiodism in Old World Buddleja. Evolution. Vol. 15, No. 3, Sept. 1961.
- Moore, R. J. and Frankton, C. (1974). The Thistles of Canada. Canada Department of Agriculture, Ottawa; Monograph No. 10.
- Norman, E. M. & Moore, R. J. (1968). Notes on Emorya (Loganiaceae). The Southwestern Naturalist. 13 (2), 137–142. Sept. 1968.
