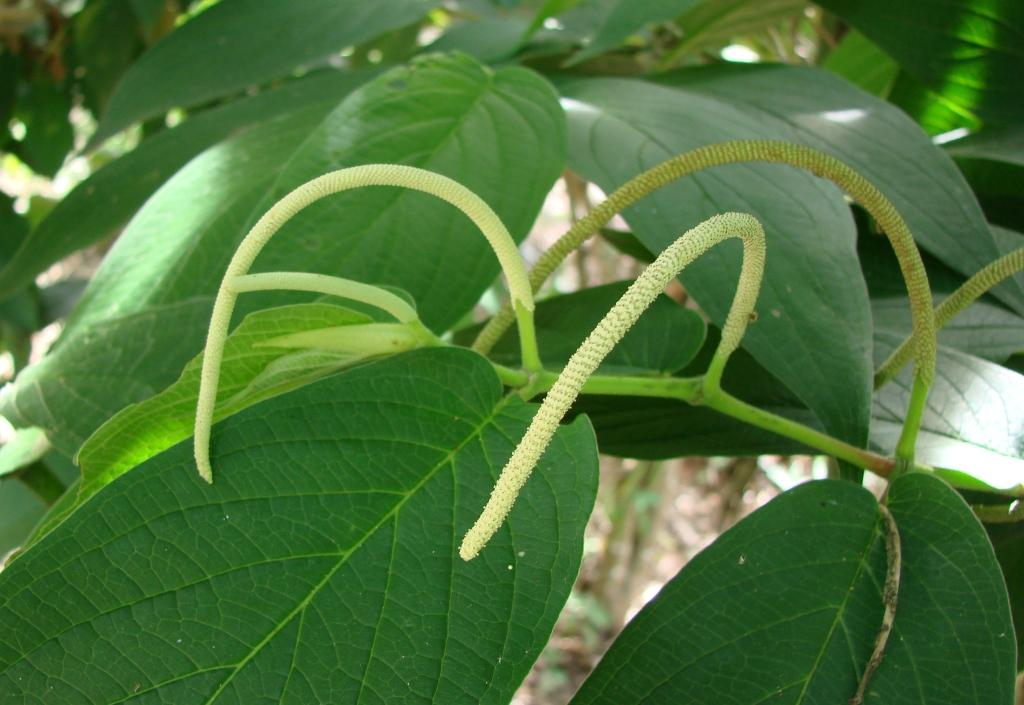

Scientific classification
- Kingdom: Plantae
- Clade: Embryophytes
- Clade: Tracheophytes
- Clade: Angiosperms
- Clade: Magnoliids
- Order: Piperales
- Family: Piperaceae
- Genus: Piper
- Species: P. aduncum

Binomial name
- Piper aduncum L.

Synonyms
- Piper angustifolium Ruiz & Pav.; Piper celtidifolium; Piper elongatum

= Piper aduncum =

Species of plant

Piper aduncum, the spiked pepper, matico, hierba del soldado, achotlín, cordoncillo, higuillo or higuillo de hoja menuda, is a flowering plant in the family Piperaceae. Like many species in the family, the matico tree has a peppery odor. It grows wild on the coasts and in the forests of Central and South America and in the Interandean Valleys, up to 3,000 m (9,800 ft) above sea level.

== Description ==
Matico is a tropical, evergreen, shrubby tree that grows to the height of 6 to 7 meters (20 to 23 ft) with lance-shaped leaves that are 12 to 20 centimetres (4 1/2 to 8 inches) long. Its fruit is a small drupe with black seeds.

== Etymology ==
According to legends, the plant was discovered on the part of Europeans by a wounded Spanish soldier named Matico. The natives had been using it before the arrival of Europeans, and Matico learned, presumably from the local tribes, that applying the leaves to his wounds stopped bleeding. It began to be called "matico" or "soldier's herb". It was introduced into the practice of medicine in the United States and Europe by a Liverpool physician in 1839 as a styptic and astringent for wounds.

== Taxonomy ==
Piper aduncum was described by Carl Linnaeus and published in Species Plantarum 1: 29. 1753.

=== Accepted varieties ===
- Piper aduncum var. cordulatum (C. DC.) Yunck.
- Piper aduncum var. ossanum (C. DC.) Saralegui

=== Synonyms ===
- Artanthe adunca (L.) Miq.
- Artanthe cearensis Miq.
- Artanthe celtidifolia (Kunth) Miq.
- Artanthe elongata (Vahl) Miq.
- Artanthe galeottii Miq.
- Artanthe galleoti Miq.
- Artanthe granulosa Miq.
- Artanthe vellozoana Miq.
- Lepianthes granulatum Raf.
- Piper acutifolium var. membranaceum C. DC.
- Piper aduncifolium Trel.
- Piper anguillaespicum Trel.
- Piper angustifolium Ruiz & Pav.
- Piper cardenasii Trel.
- Piper celtidifolium Kunth
- Piper disparispicum Trel.
- Piper elongatifolium Trel.
- Piper elongatum Vahl
- Piper fatoanum C. DC.
- Piper flavescens (C. DC.) Trel.
- Piper guanaianum C. DC.
- Piper herzogii C. DC.
- Piper intersitum f. porcecitense Trel.
- Piper kuntzei C. DC.
- Piper lineatum var. hirtipetiolatum Trel.
- Piper multinervium M. Martens & Galeotti
- Piper nonconformans Trel.
- Piper oblanceolatum var. fragilicaule Trel.
- Piper pseudovelutinum var. flavescens C. DC.
- Piper purpurascens D. Dietr.
- Piper reciprocum Trel.
- Piper submolle Trel.
- Steffensia adunca (L.) Kunth
- Steffensia angustifolia Kunth
- Steffensia celtidifolia (Kunth) Kunth
- Steffensia elongata (Vahl) Kunth

== Distribution and habitat ==
It is native to Southern Mexico, the Caribbean, and much of tropical South America. It is grown in tropical Asia, Polynesia, and Melanesia and can even be found in Florida, Hawaii, and Puerto Rico. In some countries matico is considered as an invasive weed. In parts of New Guinea, although matico is notorious for drying out the soil in the areas where it is invasive; the wood of this plant is nonetheless used by local residents for a myriad of uses such as for fuel and fence posts.

== Uses ==
=== Culinary ===
Like many species of the family, this tree has the characteristic smell of pepper. The fruits are used as a condiment and for flavoring cocoa. It is sometimes used as a substitute for long pepper.

=== Traditional medicine ===
In the Amazon rainforest, many of the native tribes use matico leaves as an antiseptic. In Peru, it was used for stopping hemorrhages and treating ulcers, and in European practice in the treatment of diseases of the genitals and urinary organs, such as those for which cubeb was often prescribed.

=== Essential oil ===
The chemical composition of the essential oil differs depending on the origin, although phenylpropanoid dillapiole is the most cited component, followed by myristicin, 1,8-cineole and β-ocimene. The essential oil of P. aduncum was considered a promising insecticide, acaricide and antiparasitic in a 2021 review.
