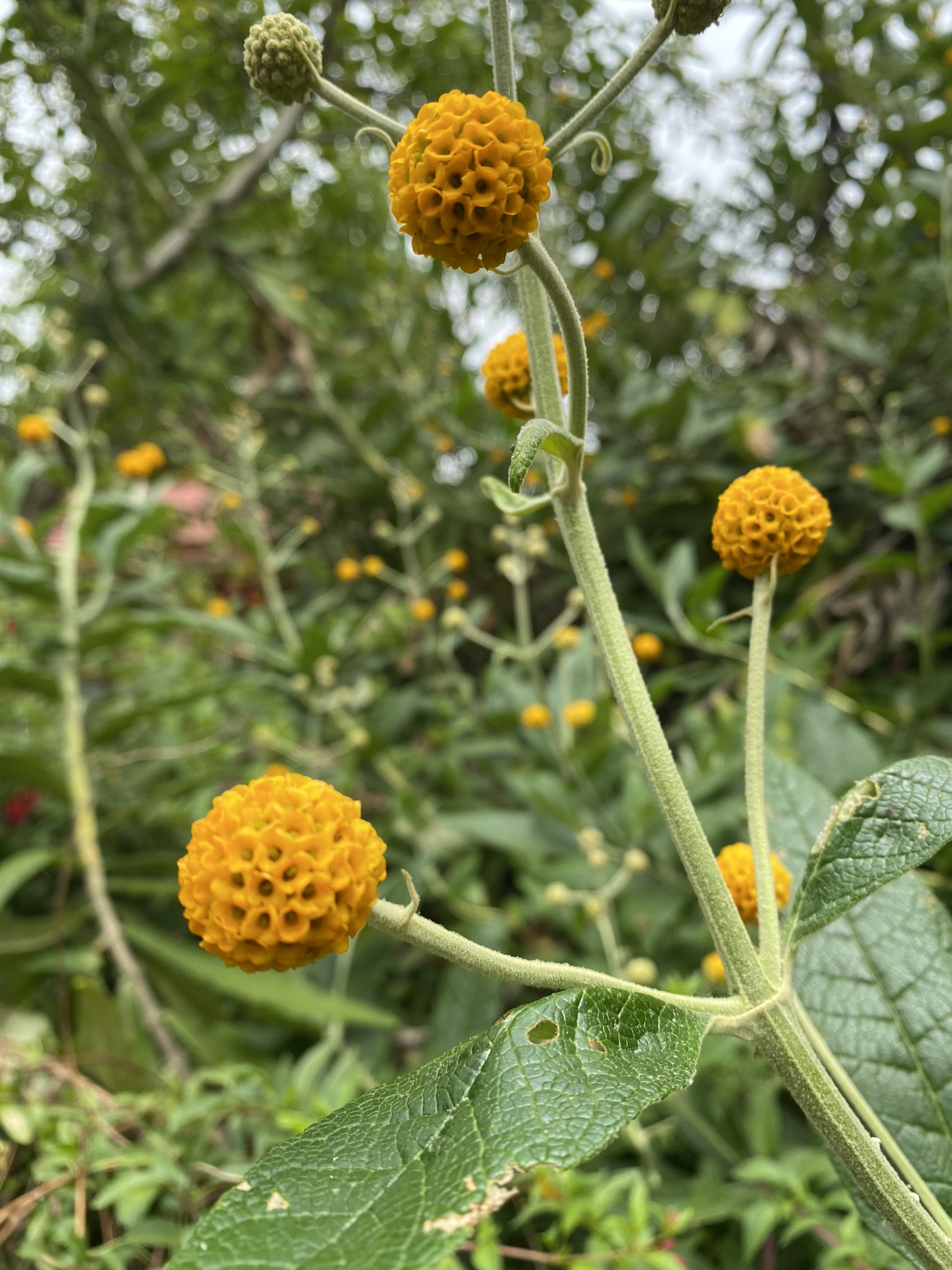

Scientific classification
- Kingdom: Plantae
- Clade: Tracheophytes
- Clade: Angiosperms
- Clade: Eudicots
- Clade: Asterids
- Order: Lamiales
- Family: Scrophulariaceae
- Genus: Buddleja
- Species: B. globosa

Binomial name
- Buddleja globosa Hope

Synonyms
- Buddleja capitata Jacq.; Buddleja connata Ruíz & Pav.; Buddleja globifera Duhamel

= Buddleja globosa =

Species of flowering plant

Buddleja globosa, also known as the orange-ball-tree, orange ball buddleja, and matico, is a species of flowering plant native to Chile and Argentina, where it grows in dry and moist forest, from sea level to 2,000 m. The species was first described and named by Hope in 1782.

== Description ==
Buddleja globosa is a large shrub to 5 m (16 ft) tall, with grey fissured bark. The young branches are subquadrangular and tomentose, bearing sessile or subsessile lanceolate or elliptic leaves 5–15 cm long by 2–6 cm wide, glabrescent and bullate above and tomentose below. The deep-yellow to orange leafy-bracted inflorescences comprise one terminal and < 7 pairs of pedunculate globose heads, 1.2–2.8 cm in diameter, each with 30–50 flowers, heavily honey-scented. Ploidy: 2n = 38 (diploid).

In common with many New World Buddlejaceae species B. globosa is dioecious: although the flowers appear hermaphrodite in having both male and female parts, only the anthers or pistils are functional in a single plant ('cryptically dioecious').

== Cultivation ==
Buddleja globosa was first introduced to the United Kingdom from Chile in 1774, and is now commonly grown as an ornamental and landscape shrub in temperate regions. Unlike B. davidii, introduced over a century later, B. globosa is not invasive owing to its wingless seeds. Hardiness: USDA zones 5–9, RHS H5.

The plant was accorded the Royal Horticultural Society's Award of Garden Merit (record 687) in 1993.

=== Cultivars ===
- Buddleja globosa 'Cally Orange'
- Buddleja globosa 'Cannington Gold'
- Buddleja globosa 'Lemon Ball'
- Buddleja globosa 'Los Lagos'
- Buddleja globosa 'HCM98017'

=== Hybrids ===
- Buddleja × weyeriana

B. globosa was hybridized with B. davidii var. magnifica by van de Weyer at Corfe Castle, England, during the First World War, the first cross between an Asiatic and an American species. The F2, rather than F1, generation are named × weyeriana; there are several popular cultivars, notably 'Sungold'.

== Uses ==
Folk medicine attributes to B. globosa wound healing properties, and the infusion of the leaves is used topically for the treatment of wounds, burns and external and internal ulcers. Chemical studies of this species have allowed to isolate glycosidic flavonoids, phenylethanoids including verbascoside, iridoids, triterpenoids, and sesquiterpenoids.

== Gallery ==
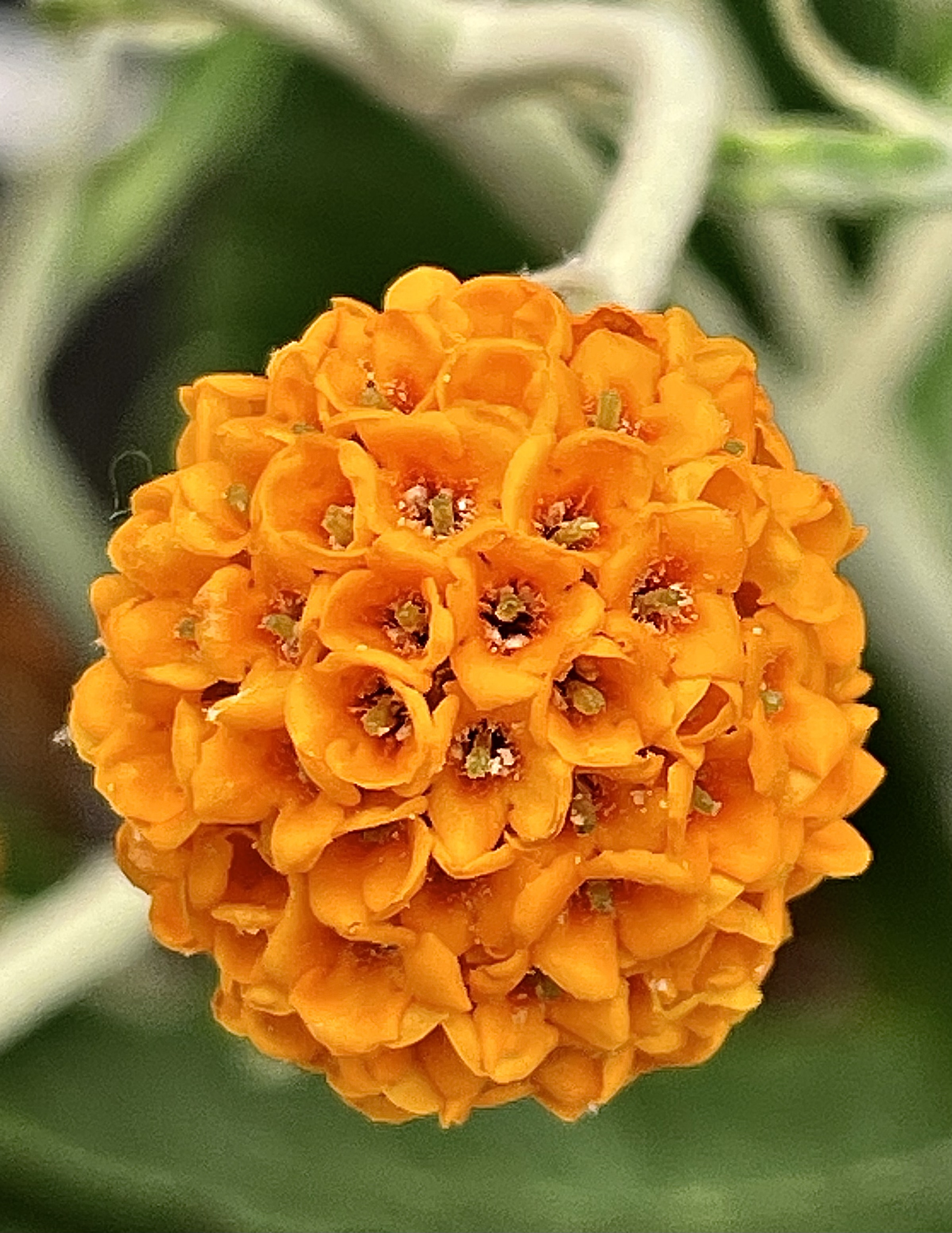
Detail of single globose flower cluster

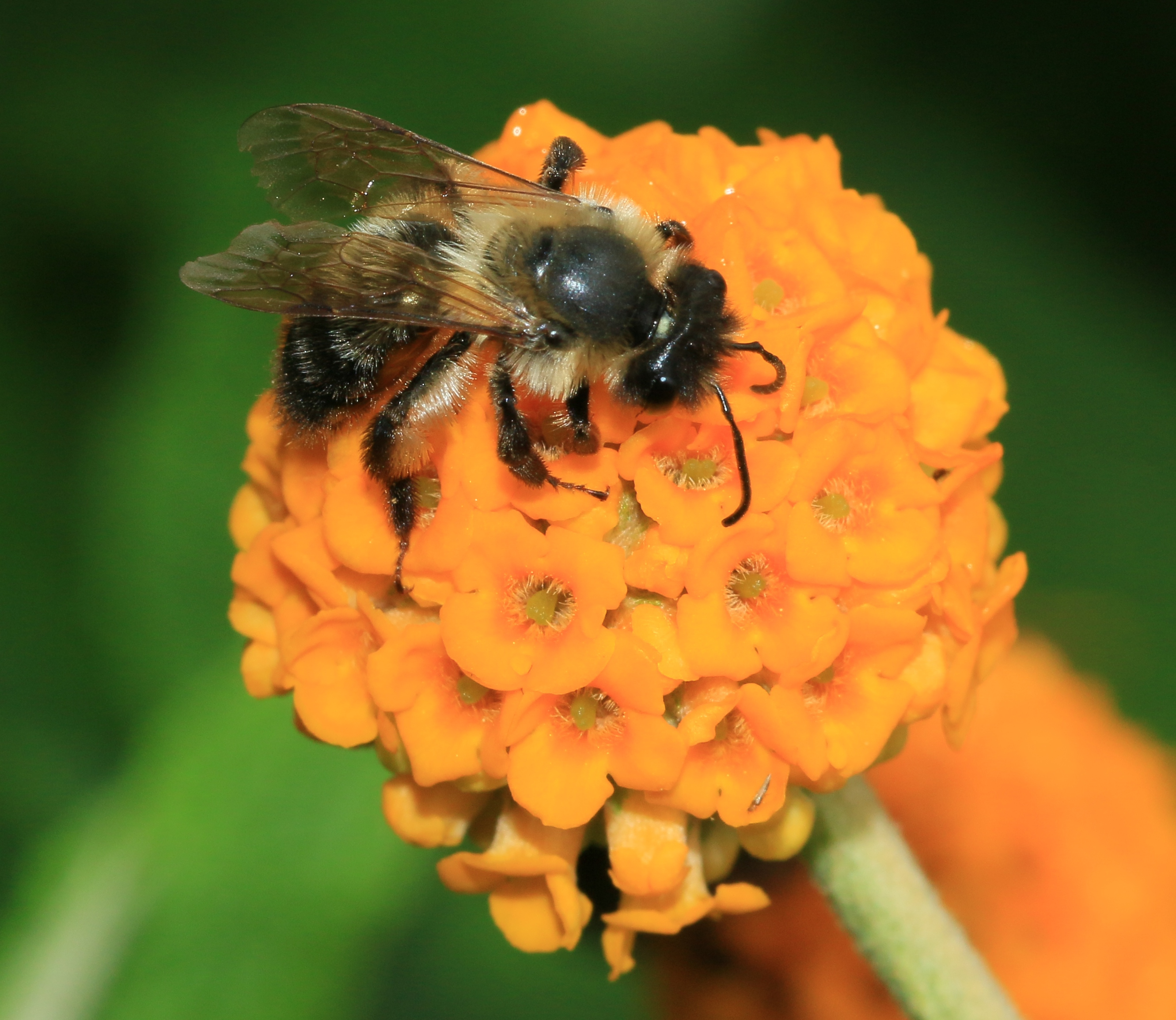
Andrena sp. pollinating spherical flower cluster

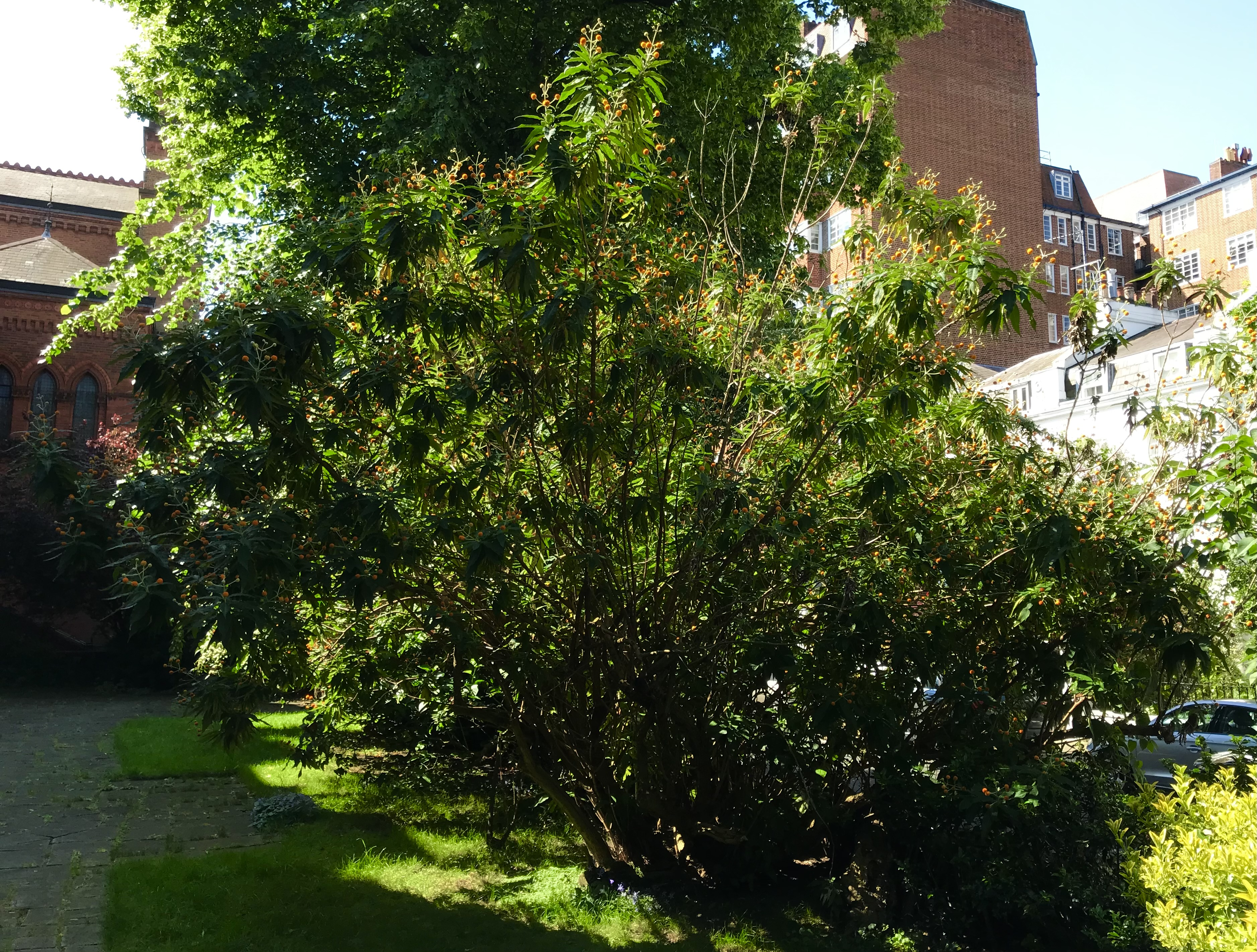
Longshot of mature specimen, Bayswater, London, U.K.

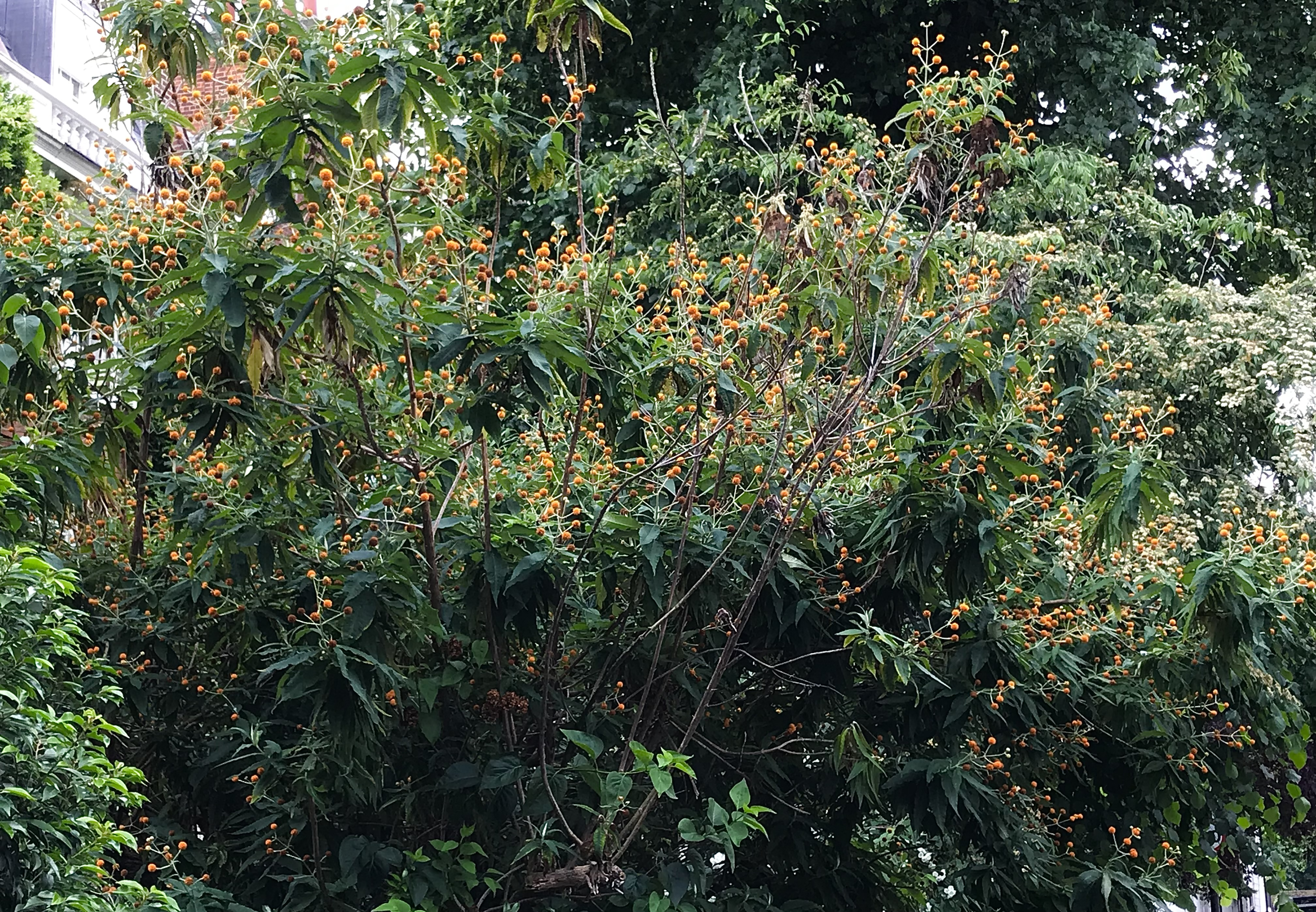
Mid-shot of Bayswater specimen
