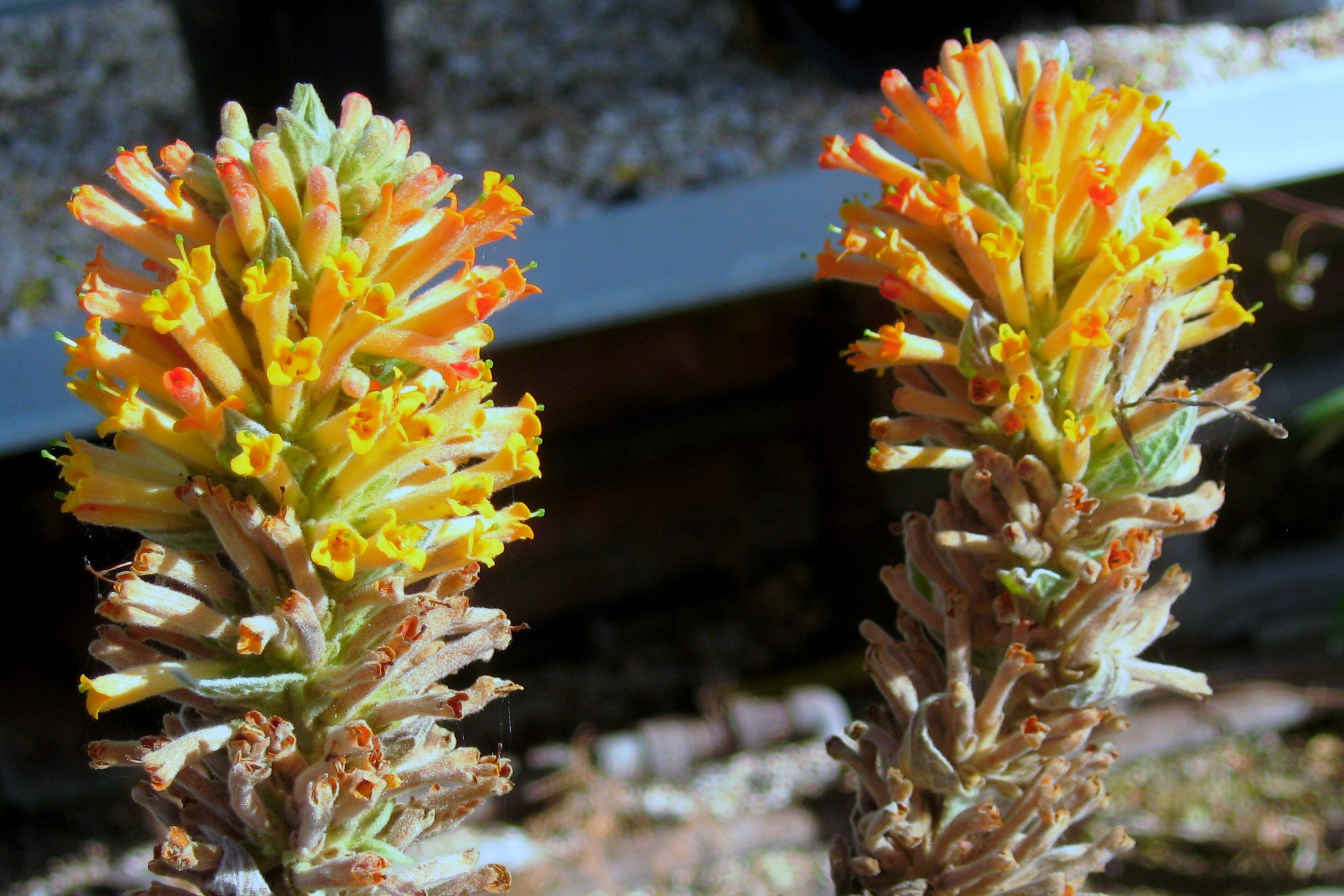
- Buddleja tubiflora panicles

Scientific classification
- Kingdom: Plantae
- Clade: Embryophytes
- Clade: Tracheophytes
- Clade: Spermatophytes
- Clade: Angiosperms
- Clade: Eudicots
- Clade: Asterids
- Order: Lamiales
- Family: Scrophulariaceae
- Genus: Buddleja
- Species: B. tubiflora

Binomial name
- Buddleja tubiflora Benth.

Synonyms
- Buddleja grandiflora Cham. & Schltdl. var. foliosa Chodat & Hassl.; Buddleja grandiflora Cham. & Schltdl. var. genuina Chodat & Hassl.; Buddleja grandiflora Cham. & Schltdl. var. paraguariensis Chodat & Hassl.; Buddleja grandiflora Cham. & Schltdl. var. tubiflora (Benth.) Chodat & Hassl.; Buddleja paraguariensis Chodat

= Buddleja tubiflora =

Species of flowering plant

Buddleja tubiflora is endemic to much of northern Argentina, southern Paraguay, and southern Brazil, where it grows at the edge of woodlands, thickets, and in old fields, at low elevations. The species was first named and described by George Bentham in 1846.

== Description ==
Buddleja tubiflora grows to < 2 m in height, with the typically lax habit creating a spread of < 3 m. The shrub is chiefly distinguished by its striking orange flowers, the corollas 25 mm long by 6 mm wide at the throat, borne in axillary clusters towards the ends of the branches. The branchlets, like the corolla tubes, are covered in a dense reddish indumentum. The leaves are mostly subsessile, lanceolate to ovate-lanceolate, 8 – 18 cm long by 2 – 6 cm wide, membranaceous, tomentulose above, tomentose below. Pollination is by hummingbirds which feed on the sweet nectar at the base of the corolla. Ploidy: 2n = 38.

== Cultivation ==
Buddleja tubiflora is cultivated in the UK, most if not all specimens derived from a long-lost example grown at the Hanbury Gardens at Mortola Inferiore, Italy. A specimen is grown under glass as part of the NCCPG national collection at Longstock Park Nursery, near Stockbridge. The shrub can be grown on a south-facing wall in coastal areas of the UK, with added protection against frost, although waterlogging overwinter is considered a greater danger to the plant. Hardiness: USDA zones 9–10.
