= Embassy of Belgium, London =

Embassy of Belgium in London
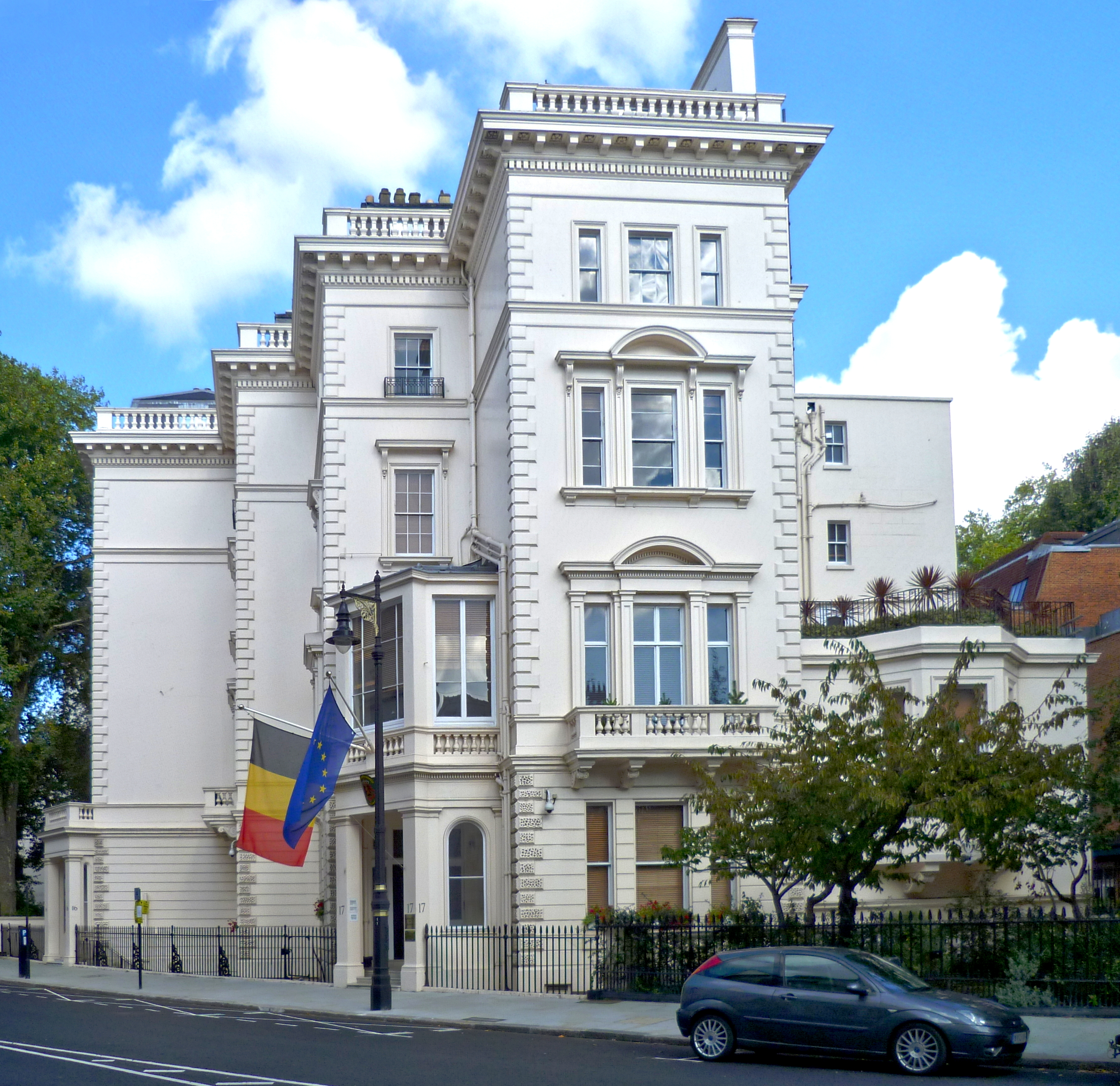
- Location: Belgravia, London
- Address: 17 Grosvenor Crescent, London, SW1X 7EE
- Coordinates: 51°30′3.6″N 0°9′11.5″W
- Ambassador: Bruno van der Pluijm

The Embassy of Belgium in London is Belgium's diplomatic mission to the United Kingdom. It is located at 17 Grosvenor Crescent, having moved from its historical location in Eaton Square in 2006. In the mid 19th century, the embassy was at 3 Grosvenor Square.

The government of Flanders also maintains a representative office at 1a Cavendish Square, Marylebone, and the Belgian Ambassador's Residence is located on Upper Belgrave Street, Belgravia.

The embassy building was designed by George Basevi in the 1860s. It is Grade II listed.

As of 18 May 2020, Bruno van der Pluijm is the ambassador, replacing Rudolf Huygelen

== Gallery ==
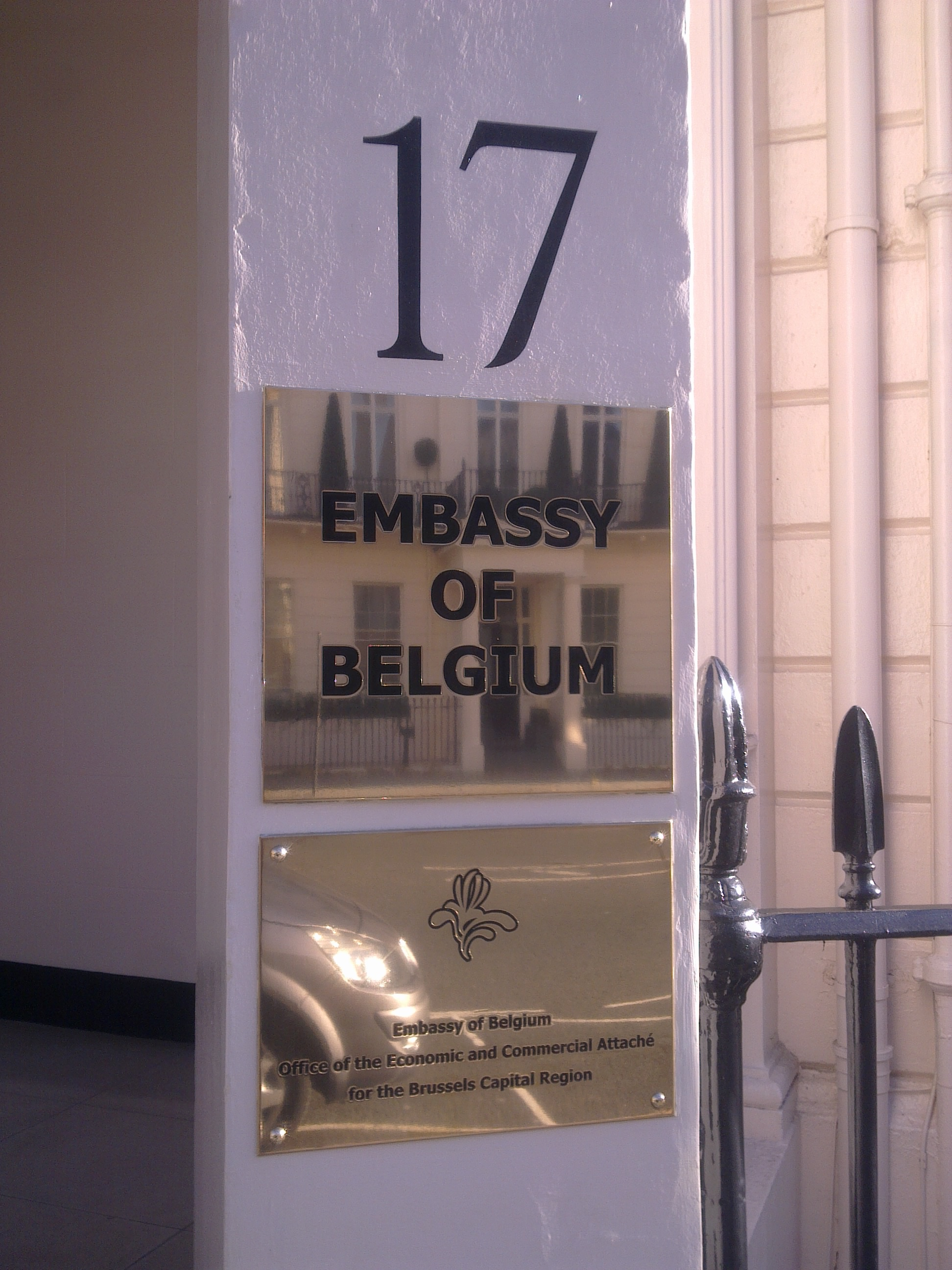
Plaque outside the embassy

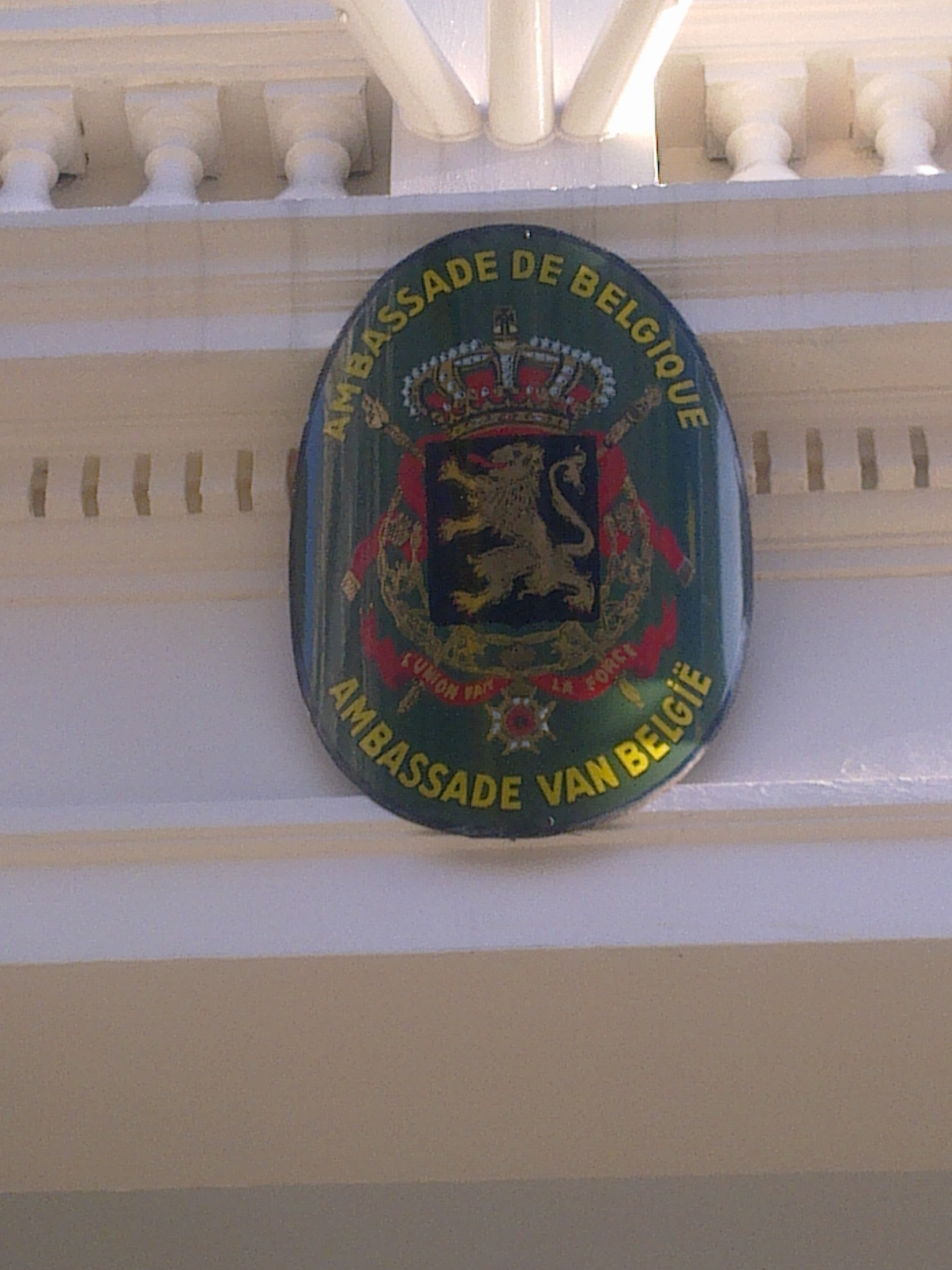
Plaque above the entrance showing the Coat of arms of Belgium, lesser version

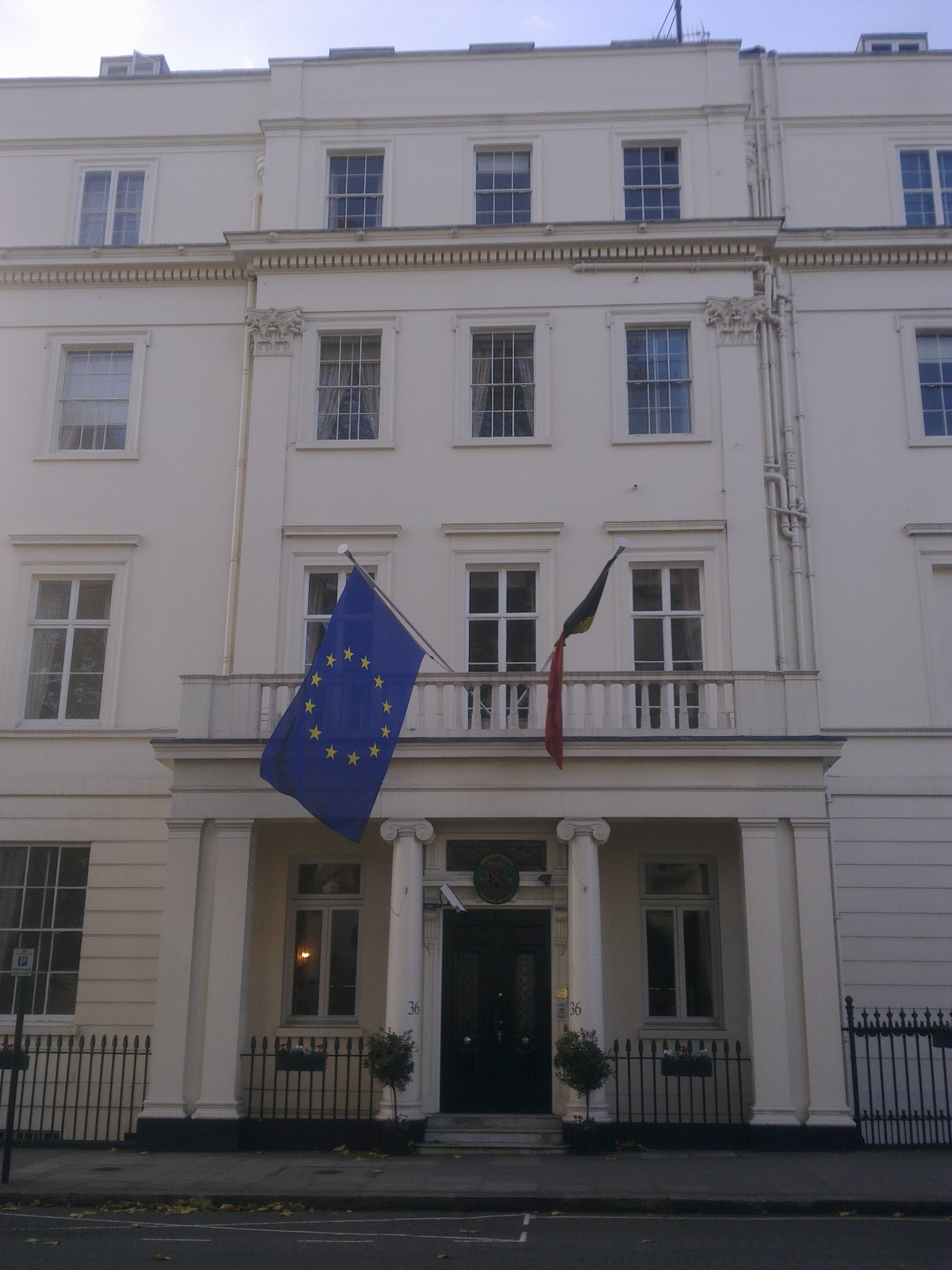
The Ambassador's Residence on Upper Belgrave Street

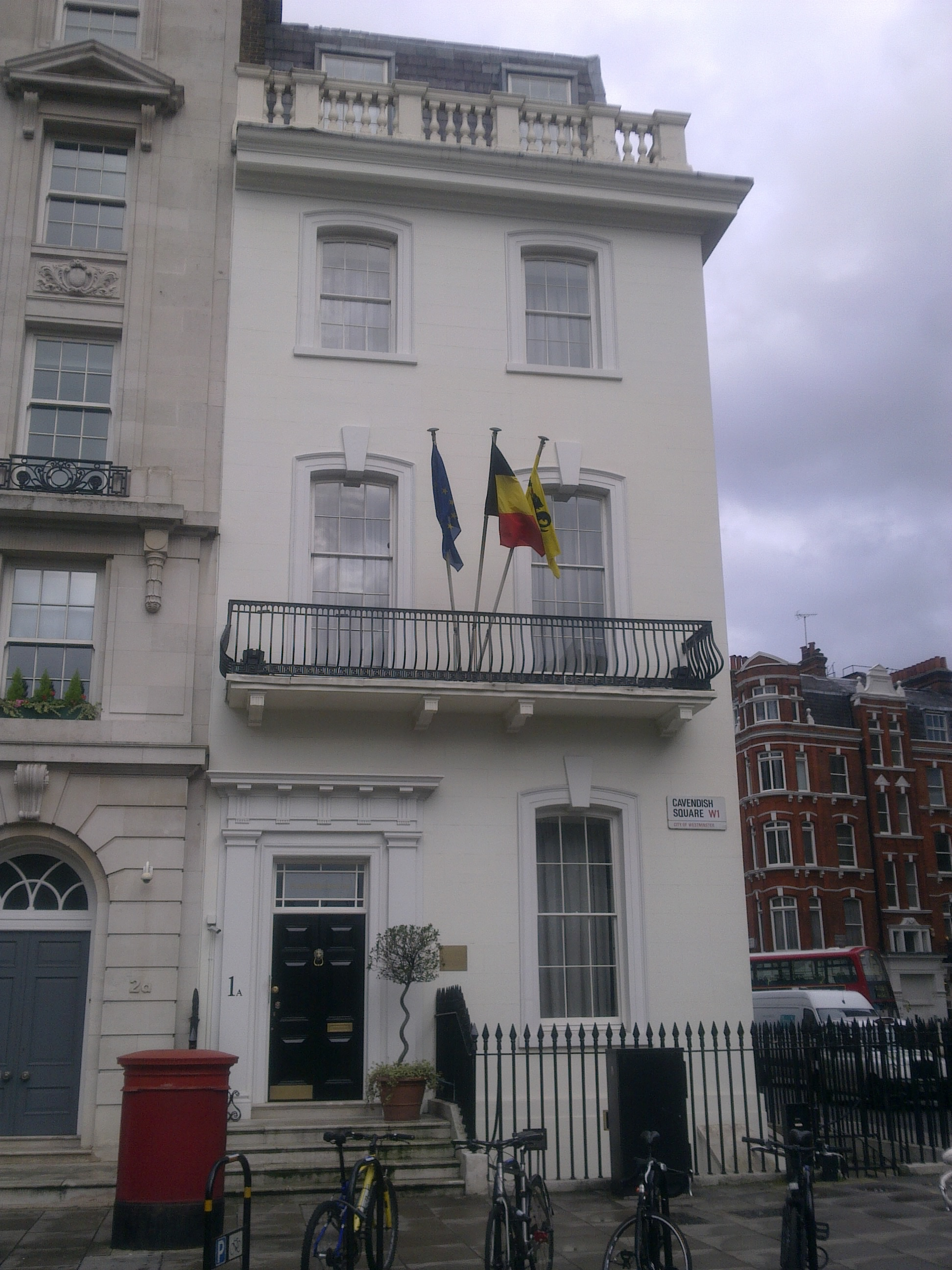
The Flemish representative office, 1A Cavendish Square
