= Raoul Delcorde =

Belgian diplomat

Raoul Delcorde is a Belgian diplomat, academic, and author. He served in the Belgian diplomatic service, holding ambassadorial posts in Sweden, Poland, and Canada, and senior positions within the Ministry of Foreign Affairs.

== Education ==
Delcorde studied in the mid-seventies at Paris IV-Sorbonne University where he obtained a bachelor's degree in history, a master's degree in philosophy. He also holds a master's degree in International Relations from Université catholique de Louvain. He earned a PhD in Political Science (International Relations) from the Université catholique de Louvain, summa cum laude.

== Career ==
Delcorde joined the Belgian diplomatic service. His early assignments included Deputy Head of Mission in Islamabad, First Secretary at the Belgian Mission to the United Nations in New York, and First Secretary at the Belgian Mission to the Organization for Security and Cooperation in Europe in Vienna. He later served as Minister-Counsellor at the Belgian Embassy in Washington, D.C.

He was appointed Ambassador of Belgium to Sweden (2003–2007), Ambassador of Belgium to Poland (2010–2014), and Ambassador of Belgium to Canada (2014–2018). Within the Ministry of Foreign Affairs in Brussels, he served as deputy director for European Affairs, Deputy Director General for Multilateral Affairs, and Director for the Middle East and North Africa.

Delcorde has also taught as a Guest Professor at the School of political science of the Université catholique de Louvain. He has been also a Guest Professor in international relations at the University of Montréal and at Georgetown University (Washington). He was elected President of the Club Diplomatique de Belgique. He is a member of the Académie Royale de Belgique and of the Académie des sciences d’outre-mer in France.

== Selected publications ==
He has published works on diplomacy, international relations, and Belgian foreign service, and is active in academic and diplomatic circles in Belgium and abroad. Here are some of his selected publications.

- La sécurité et la stratégie dans le golfe arabo-persique (1983)
- Le jeu des grandes puissances dans l’Océan Indien (1993)
- Les diplomates belges (2010)
- La carrière diplomatique en Belgique (2022)
- Le métier de diplomate (2018)
- Diplomatie et politique étrangère à l’heure de la mondialisation (2020)
- International Diplomatic Negotiation (2025)
