= List of diplomatic missions of Belgium =

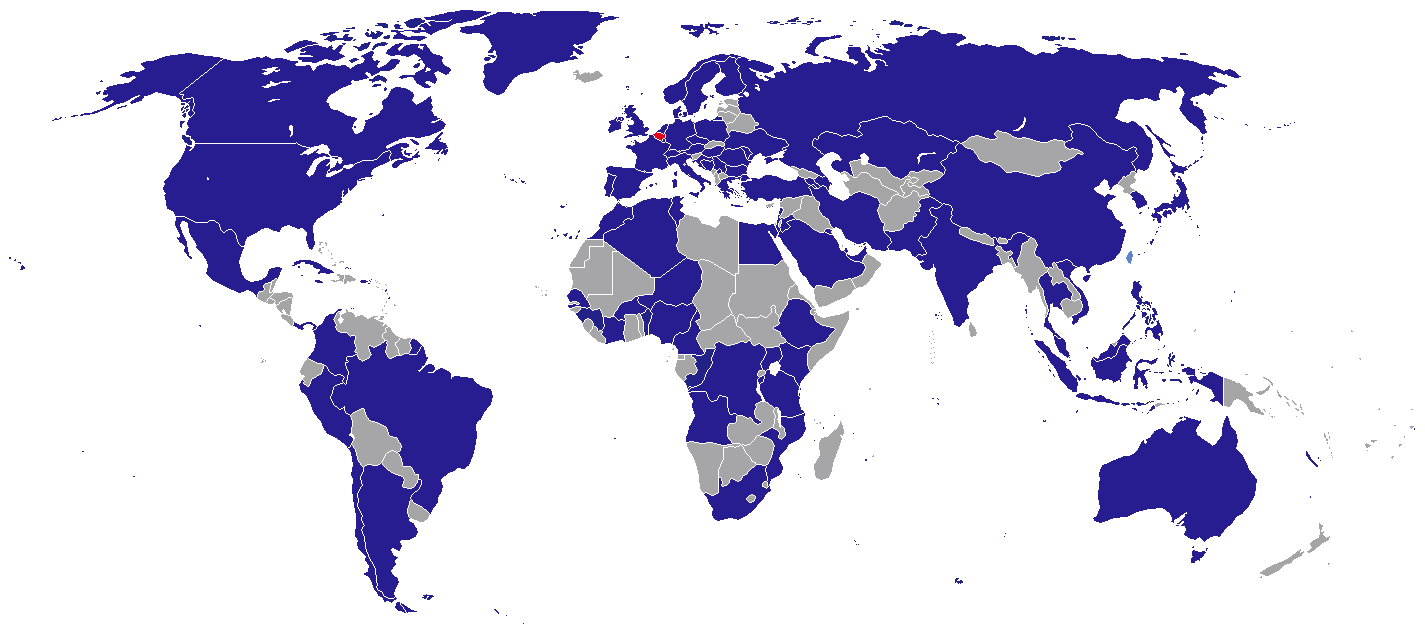
Map of Belgian diplomatic missions

The Kingdom of Belgium is unique in having three networks of representation — one for the Belgian federal state, another for Dutch-speaking community and Flemish Region, and a third one for the French-speaking Community and the Walloon region, often comprising international missions of the Brussels-Capital Region and, more rarely, the German-speaking Community of Belgium. However officers representing the governments of the communities and Brussels, Flanders and Wallonia are usually co-located together with the diplomatic representation of Belgium, as most countries do not consider regions to be states.

Excluded from this listing are honorary consulates, representative offices of the communities and regions of Belgium, development offices, and trade missions. On the other hand, the trade mission in Taipei, known as the "Belgian Office, Taipei (BOT)" is included as it serves as a de facto embassy to Taiwan.

== Current missions ==
=== Africa ===
| Host country | Host city | Mission | Concurrent accreditation | Ref. |
|---|---|---|---|---|
| Algeria | Algiers | Embassy | | |
| Angola | Luanda | Embassy | Countries: São Tomé and Príncipe | |
| Benin | Cotonou | Embassy | Countries: Togo | |
| Burkina Faso | Ouagadougou | Embassy | Countries: Mali | |
| Burundi | Bujumbura | Embassy | | |
| Cameroon | Yaoundé | Embassy | Countries: Central African Republic; Equatorial Guinea; Gabon | |
| Congo-Brazzaville | Brazzaville | Embassy | | |
| Congo-Kinshasa | Kinshasa | Embassy | | |
| Congo-Kinshasa | Lubumbashi | Consulate-General | | |
| Egypt | Cairo | Embassy | Countries: Sudan | |
| Ethiopia | Addis Ababa | Embassy | Countries: Djibouti; Multilateral Organizations: African Union; Intergovernmental Authority on Development | |
| Guinea | Conakry | Embassy (Note: To be closed in 2026.) | | |
| Ivory Coast | Abidjan | Embassy | Countries: Ghana; Liberia; Sierra Leone | |
| Kenya | Nairobi | Embassy | Countries: Comoros; Eritrea; Madagascar; Seychelles; Somalia; Multilateral Organizations: United Nations; United Nations Environment Programme; United Nations Human Settlements Programme | |
| Morocco | Rabat | Embassy | Countries: Mauritania | |
| Mozambique | Maputo | Diplomatic office (Note: Subordinate to the Belgian embassy in Pretoria, South Africa.) | | |
| Niger | Niamey | Embassy | Countries: Chad | |
| Nigeria | Abuja | Embassy | | |
| Senegal | Dakar | Embassy | Countries: Cape Verde; Gambia; Guinea-Bissau | |
| South Africa | Pretoria | Embassy | Countries: Botswana; Eswatini; Lesotho; Mozambique; Namibia; Zimbabwe | |
| South Africa | Cape Town | Consulate-General | Countries: Botswana; Eswatini; Lesotho; Mozambique; Namibia; Zimbabwe | |
| Tanzania | Dar es Salaam | Embassy | Countries: Zambia; Malawi; Mauritius | |
| Tunisia | Tunis | Embassy | Countries: Libya | |
| Uganda | Kampala | Embassy | Countries: South Sudan | |

=== Americas ===
| Host country | Host city | Mission | Concurrent accreditation | Ref. |
|---|---|---|---|---|
| Argentina | Buenos Aires | Embassy | Countries: Paraguay; Uruguay | |
| Brazil | Brasília | Embassy | | |
| Brazil | São Paulo | Consulate-General | | |
| Canada | Ottawa | Embassy | | |
| Canada | Montreal | Consulate-General | | |
| Chile | Santiago de Chile | Embassy | | |
| Colombia | Bogotá | Embassy | Countries: Venezuela | |
| Jamaica | Kingston | Embassy | Countries: Antigua and Barbuda; Barbados; Dominica; Grenada; Guyana; Saint Kitts and Nevis; Saint Lucia; Saint Vincent and the Grenadines; Suriname; Trinidad and Tobago; Multilateral Organizations: Caribbean Community (Note: Accredited as an observer mission.); International Seabed Authority | |
| Mexico | Mexico City | Embassy | Countries: Belize | |
| Panama | Panama City | Embassy | Countries: Costa Rica; Cuba; Dominican Republic; El Salvador; Guatemala; Haiti; Honduras; Nicaragua | |
| Peru | Lima | Embassy | Countries: Bolivia; Ecuador | |
| United States | Washington, D.C. | Embassy | Countries: Bahamas; Multilateral Organizations: Organization of American States | |
| United States | Atlanta | Consulate-General | Countries: Bahamas; Multilateral Organizations: Organization of American States | |
| United States | Los Angeles | Consulate-General | Countries: Bahamas; Multilateral Organizations: Organization of American States | |
| United States | New York City | Consulate-General | Countries: Bahamas; Multilateral Organizations: Organization of American States | |

=== Asia ===
| Host country | Host city | Mission | Concurrent accreditation | Ref. |
|---|---|---|---|---|
| Armenia | Yerevan | Embassy | | |
| Azerbaijan | Baku | Embassy | Countries: Georgia; Turkmenistan | |
| China | Beijing | Embassy | Countries: Mongolia | |
| China | Guangzhou | Consulate-General | Countries: Mongolia | |
| China | Hong Kong | Consulate-General | Countries: Mongolia | |
| China | Shanghai | Consulate-General | Countries: Mongolia | |
| India | New Delhi | Embassy | Countries: Bangladesh; Bhutan; Maldives; Nepal; Sri Lanka | |
| India | Mumbai | Consulate-General | Countries: Bangladesh; Bhutan; Maldives; Nepal; Sri Lanka | |
| Indonesia | Jakarta | Embassy | Countries: Timor-Leste; Multilateral Organizations: Association of Southeast Asian Nations | |
| Iran | Tehran | Embassy | | |
| Israel | Tel Aviv | Embassy | | |
| Japan | Tokyo | Embassy | | |
| Jordan | Amman | Embassy | Countries: Iraq | |
| Kazakhstan | Astana | Embassy | Countries: Kyrgyzstan; Tajikistan | |
| Kuwait | Kuwait City | Embassy | Countries: Bahrain | |
| Lebanon | Beirut | Embassy | | |
| Malaysia | Kuala Lumpur | Embassy | Countries: Brunei | |
| Pakistan | Islamabad | Embassy | Countries: Afghanistan | |
| Palestine | Jerusalem | Consulate-General (Note: This consulate general is neither accredited to Israel nor is it subordinate to the Belgian embassy in Tel Aviv. It has a special status, reporting directly to Brussels. Its jurisdiction covers both Jerusalem (the Corpus separatum) and the territories occupied by Israel in 1967 (West Bank and Gaza), and is accredited as well to the Palestinian Authority.) | Multilateral Organizations: UNRWA | |
| Philippines | Manila | Embassy | Countries: Marshall Islands; Micronesia; Palau | |
| Qatar | Doha | Embassy | | |
| Saudi Arabia | Riyadh | Embassy | Countries: Oman; Yemen | |
| Singapore | Singapore | Embassy | | |
| South Korea | Seoul | Embassy | Countries: North Korea | |
| Taiwan | Taipei | Office | | |
| Thailand | Bangkok | Embassy | Countries: Cambodia; Laos; Myanmar | |
| Turkey | Ankara | Embassy | | |
| Turkey | Istanbul | Consulate-General | | |
| United Arab Emirates | Abu Dhabi | Embassy | | |
| Uzbekistan | Tashkent | Embassy | | |
| Vietnam | Hanoi | Embassy | | |

=== Europe ===
| Host country | Host city | Mission | Concurrent accreditation | Ref. |
|---|---|---|---|---|
| Albania | Tirana | Embassy | | |
| Austria | Vienna | Embassy | Countries: Slovakia; Slovenia; Multilateral Organizations: United Nations; International Atomic Energy Agency; UNIDO; UNODC; UNCITRAL | |
| Bulgaria | Sofia | Embassy | Countries: North Macedonia | |
| Croatia | Zagreb | Embassy | Countries: Bosnia and Herzegovina | |
| Czechia | Prague | Embassy | | |
| Denmark | Copenhagen | Embassy | | |
| Finland | Helsinki | Embassy | Countries: Estonia | |
| France | Paris | Embassy | Countries: Monaco | |
| France | Marseille | Consulate-General | Countries: Monaco | |
| Germany | Berlin | Embassy | | |
| Greece | Athens | Embassy | Countries: Cyprus | |
| Holy See (Note: The Belgian Embassy to the Holy See is located outside Vatican territory in Rome.) | Rome | Embassy | | |
| Hungary | Budapest | Embassy | | |
| Ireland | Dublin | Embassy | | |
| Italy | Rome | Embassy | Countries: Malta; San Marino; Multilateral Organizations: Food and Agriculture Organization; International Fund for Agricultural Development; World Food Programme | |
| Kosovo | Pristina | Embassy | | |
| Luxembourg | Luxembourg City | Embassy | | |
| Moldova | Chișinău | Embassy | | |
| Netherlands | The Hague | Embassy | | |
| Norway | Oslo | Embassy | Countries: Iceland | |
| Poland | Warsaw | Embassy | Countries: Lithuania | |
| Portugal | Lisbon | Embassy | | |
| Romania | Bucharest | Embassy | | |
| Russia | Moscow | Embassy | Countries: Belarus | |
| Serbia | Belgrade | Embassy | Countries: Montenegro | |
| Spain | Madrid | Embassy | Countries: Andorra | |
| Spain | Alicante | Consulate | Countries: Andorra | |
| Spain | Barcelona | Consulate | Countries: Andorra | |
| Spain | Santa Cruz de Tenerife | Consulate | Countries: Andorra | |
| Sweden | Stockholm | Embassy | Countries: Latvia | |
| Switzerland | Bern | Embassy | Countries: Liechtenstein | |
| Ukraine | Kyiv | Embassy | | |
| United Kingdom | London | Embassy | Multilateral Organizations: International Maritime Organization | |

=== Oceania ===
| Host country | Host city | Mission | Concurrent accreditation | Ref. |
|---|---|---|---|---|
| Australia | Canberra | Embassy | Countries: Cook Islands; Fiji; Kiribati; Nauru; New Zealand; Papua New Guinea; Samoa; Solomon Islands; Tonga; Tuvalu; Vanuatu | |

=== Multilateral organizations ===
| Organization | Host city | Host country | Mission | Concurrent accreditation | Ref. |
|---|---|---|---|---|---|
| Council of Europe | Strasbourg | France | Permanent Representation | | |
| European Union | Brussels | Belgium | Permanent Representation | | |
| NATO | Brussels | Belgium | Permanent Representation | | |
| OECD | Paris | France | Permanent Delegation | Multilateral Organizations: UNESCO | |
| OSCE | Vienna | Austria | Permanent Representation | | |
| United Nations | New York City | United States | Permanent Mission | | |
| United Nations | Geneva | Switzerland | Permanent Mission | Multilateral Organizations: Conference on Disarmament; World Health Organization; World Trade Organization | |

== Gallery ==
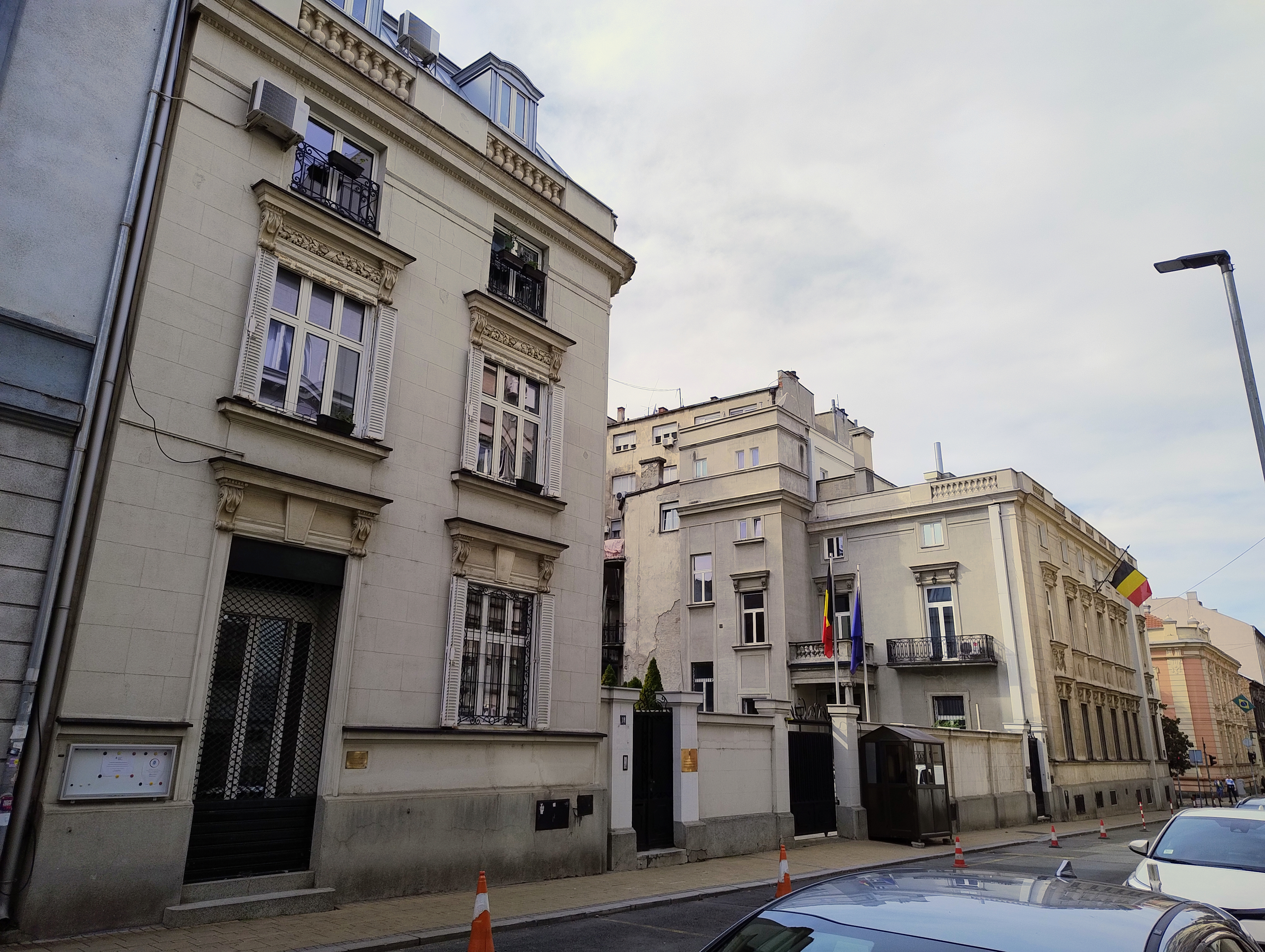
Embassy in Belgrade

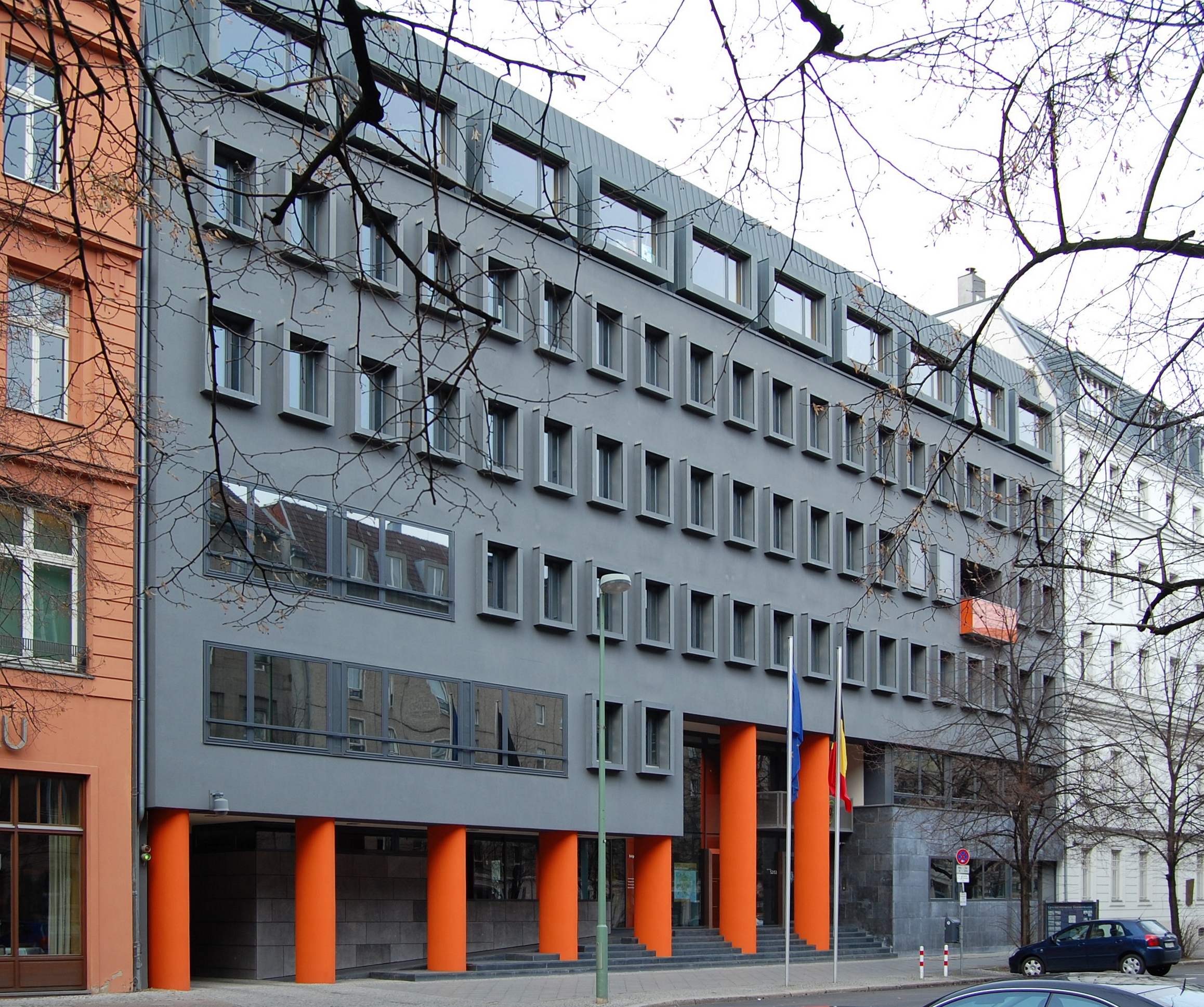
Embassy in Berlin

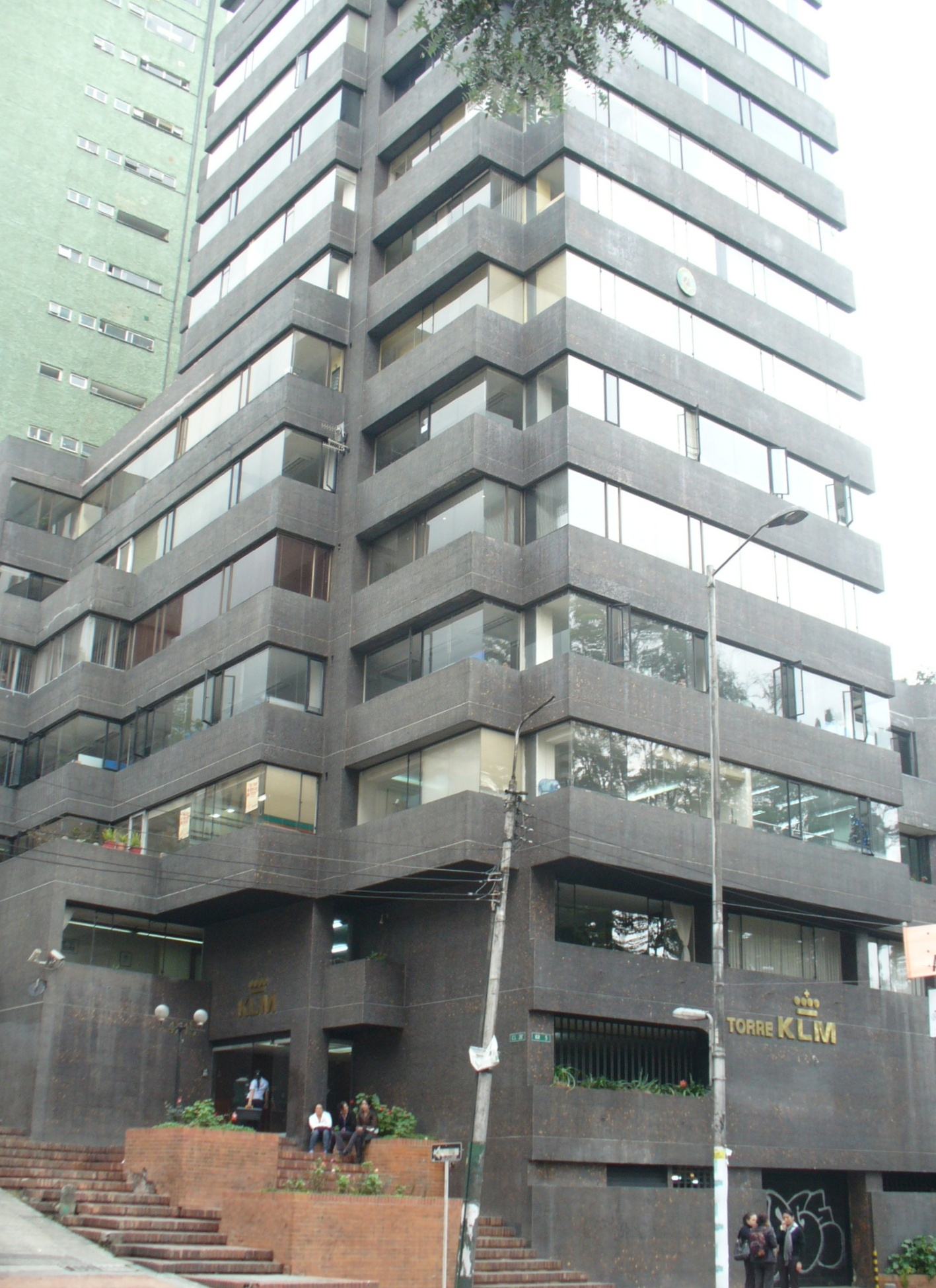
Embassy in Bogotá

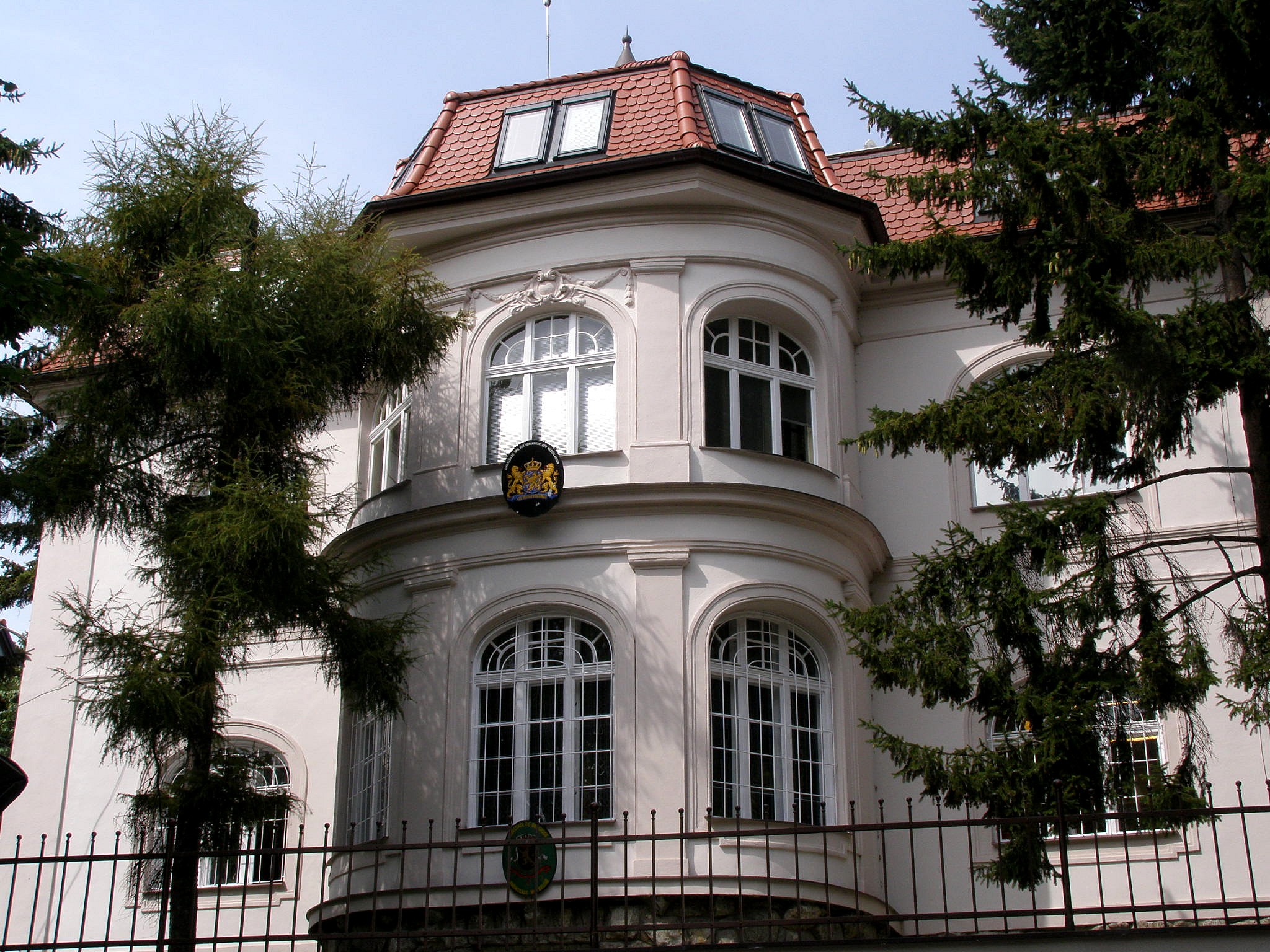
Embassy in Bratislava

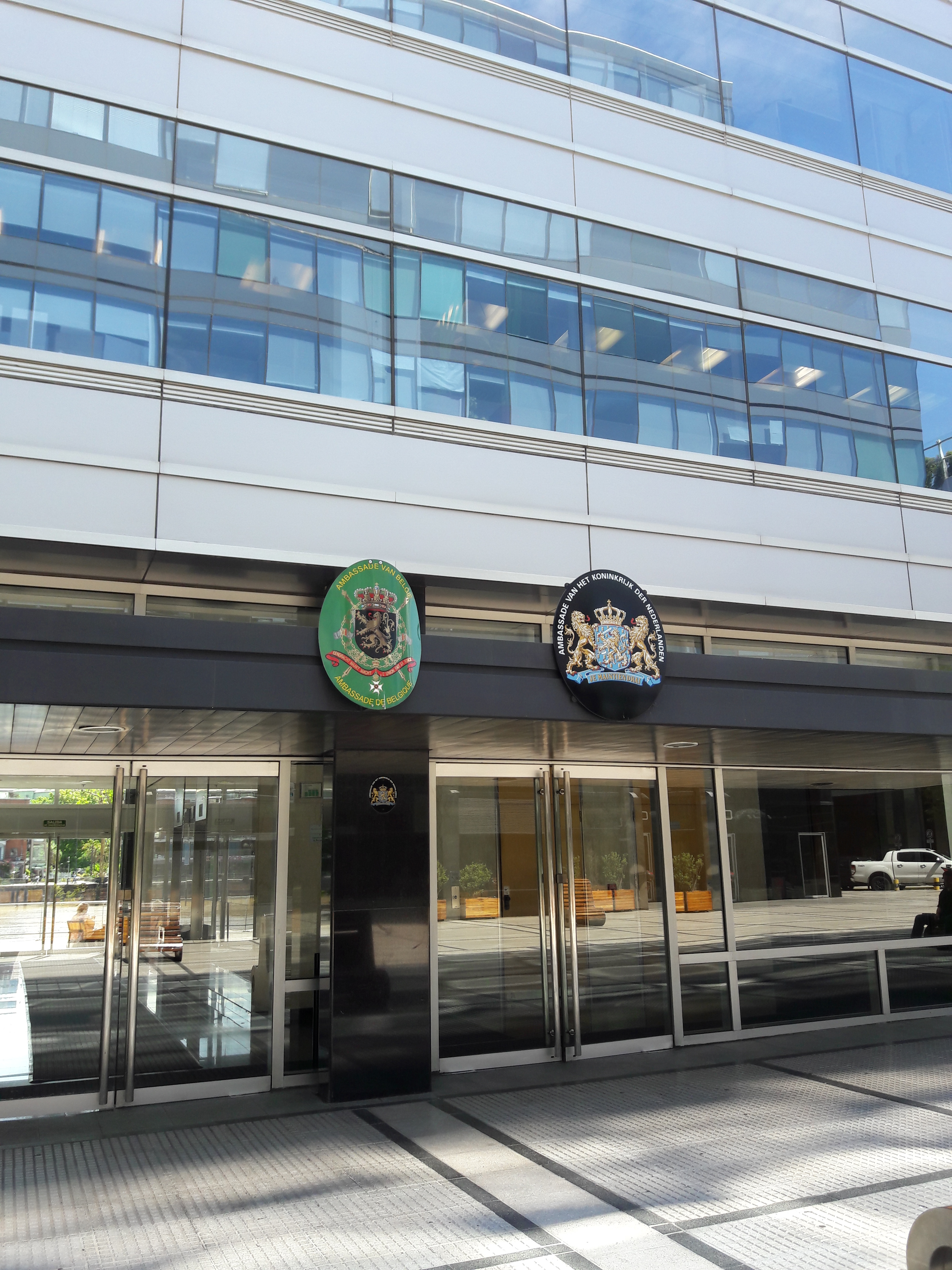
Embassy in Buenos Aires

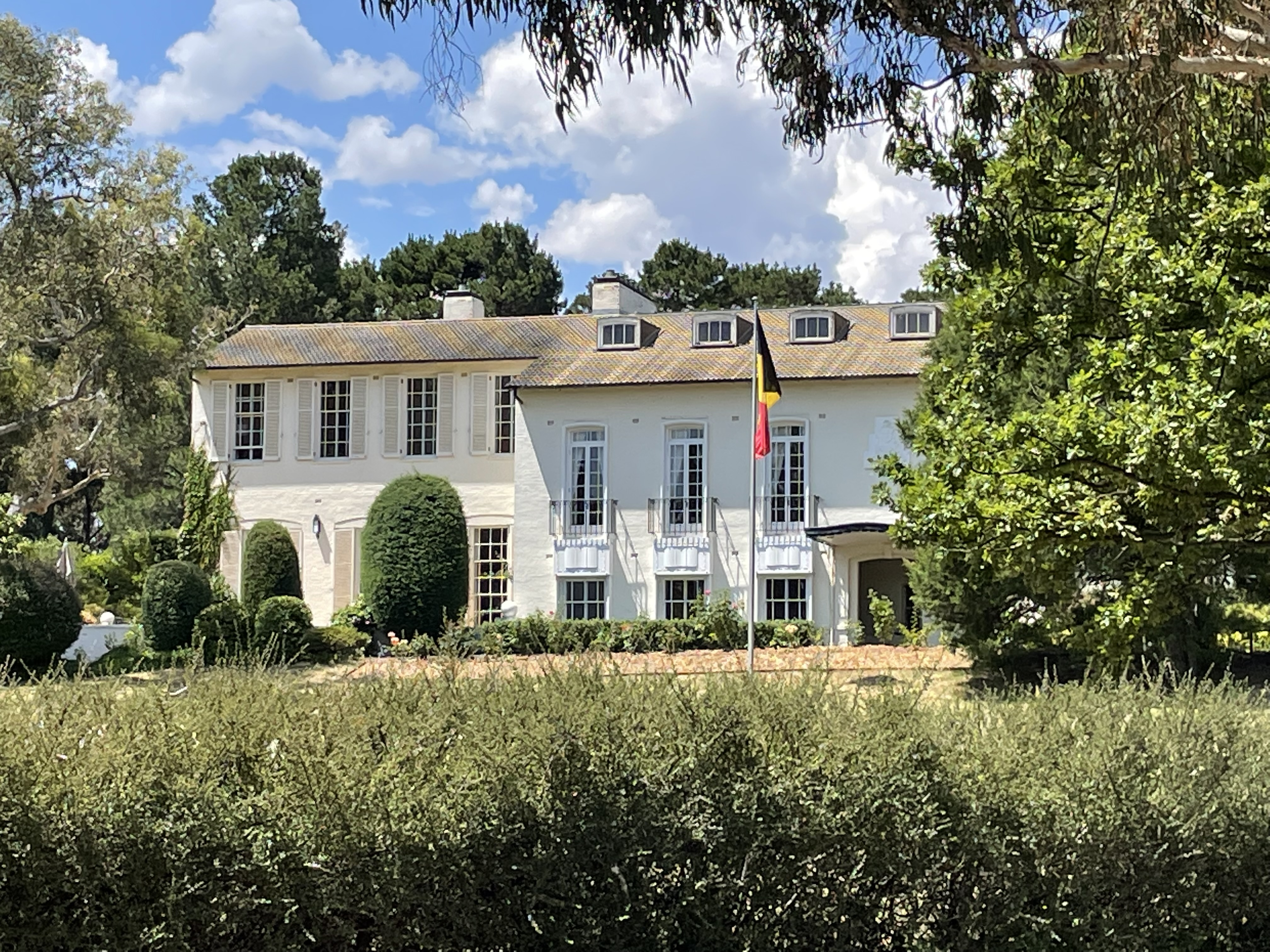
Embassy in Canberra

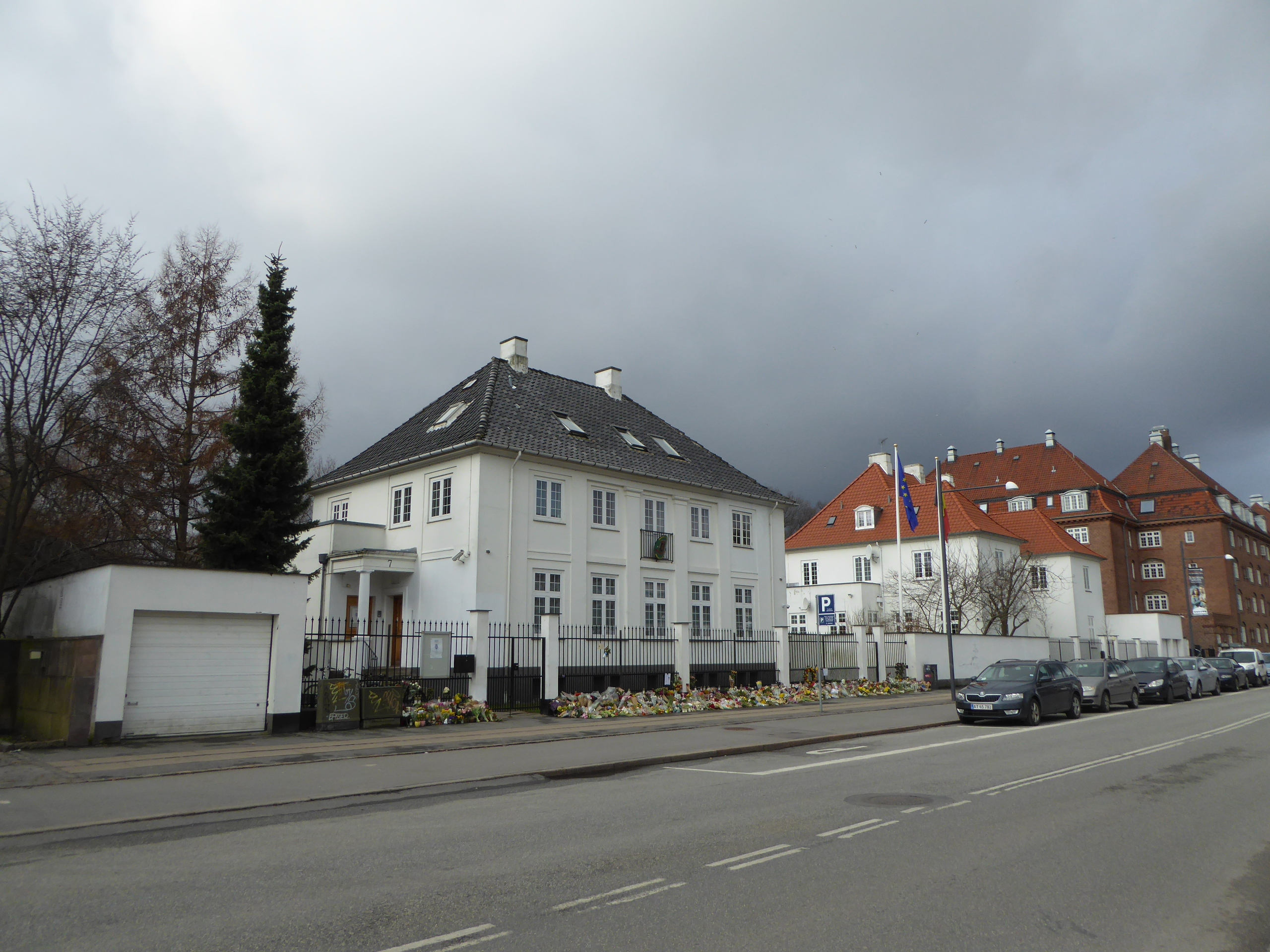
Embassy in Copenhagen

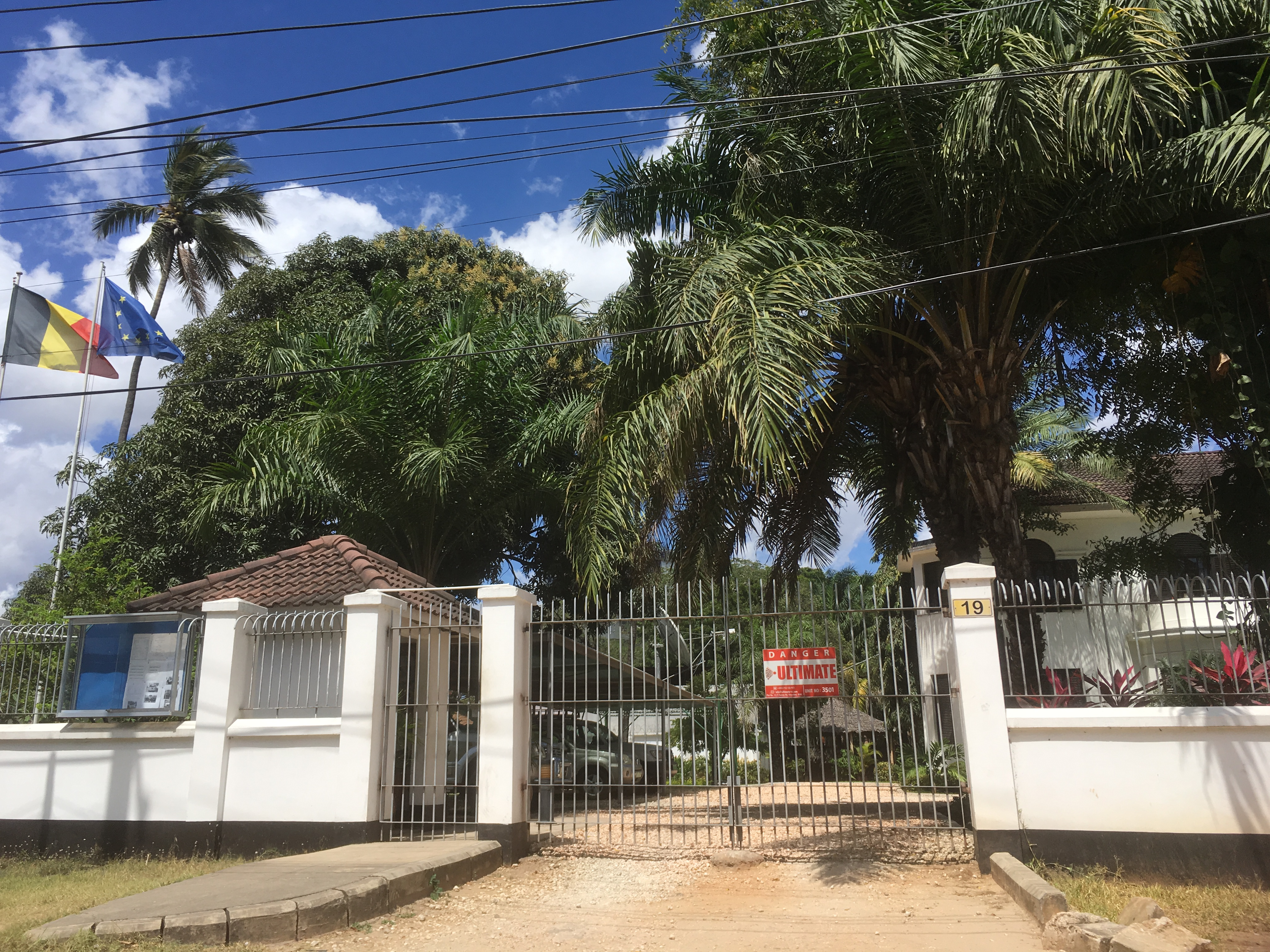
Embassy in Dar es Salaam

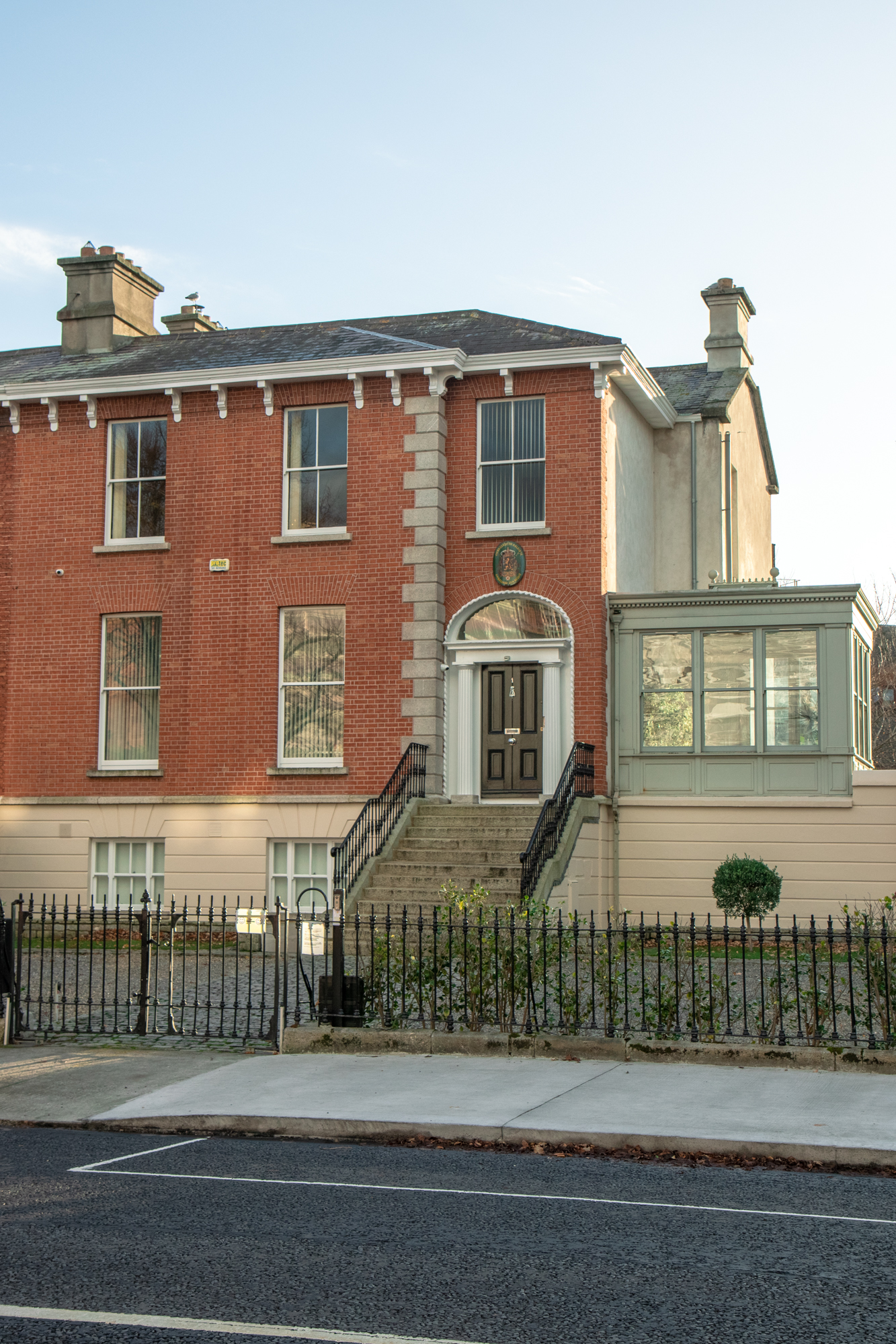
Embassy in Dublin

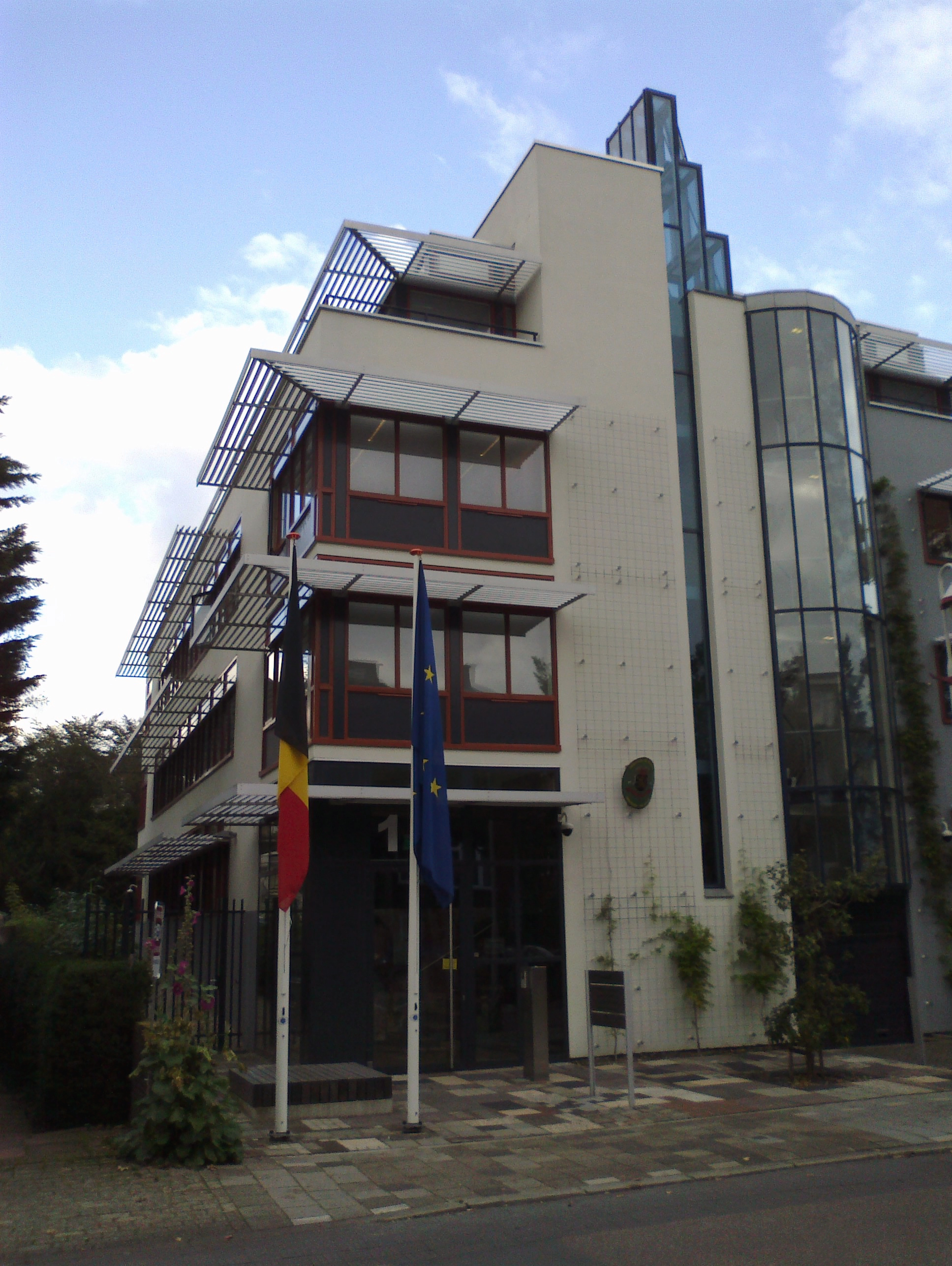
Embassy in The Hague

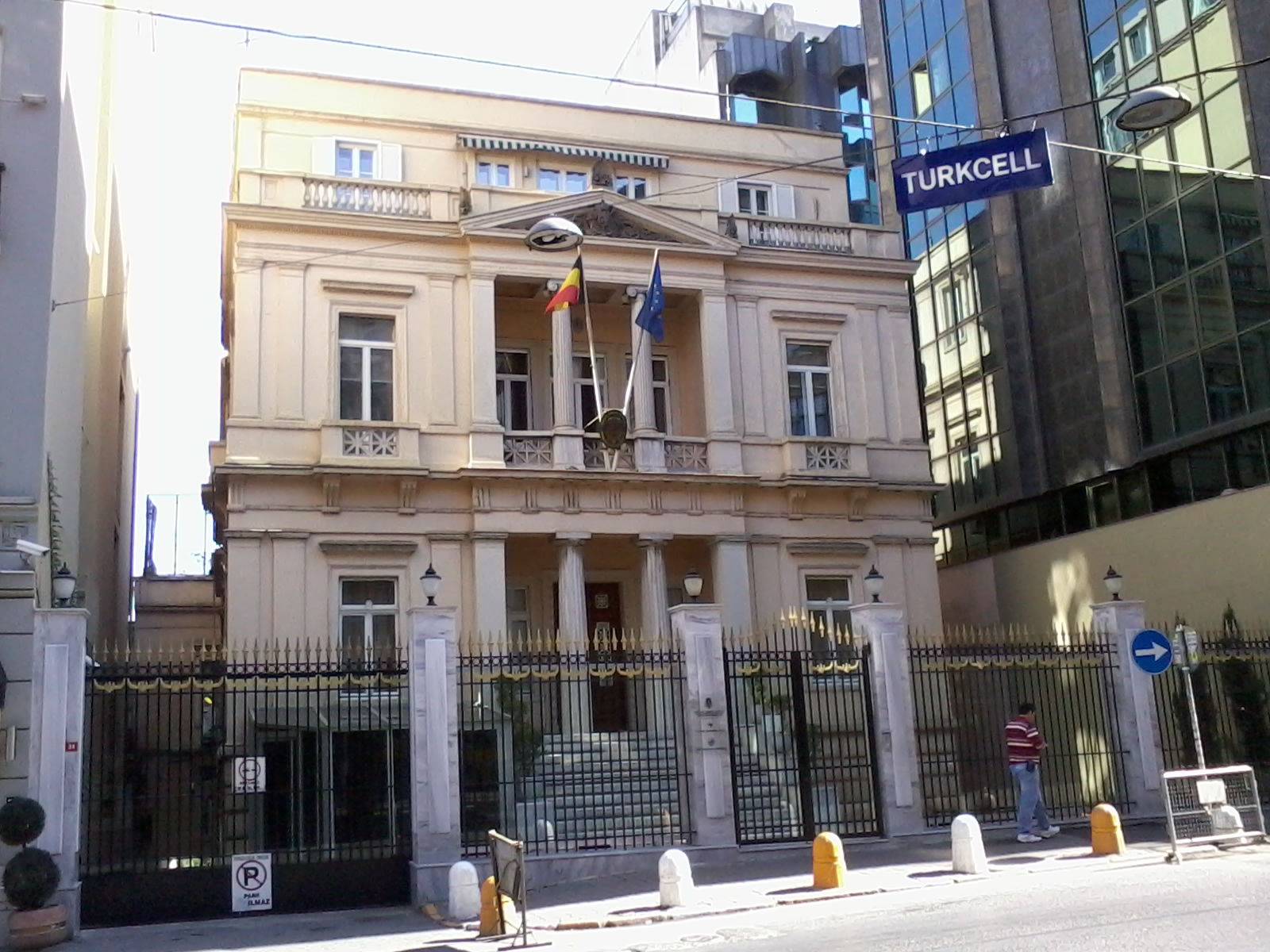
Consulate-General in Istanbul

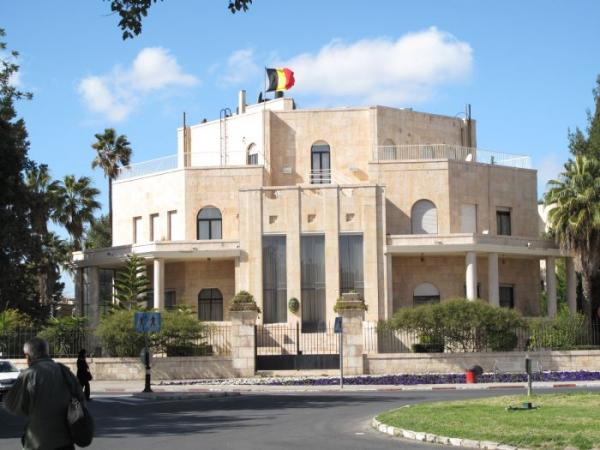
Consulate-General in Jerusalem

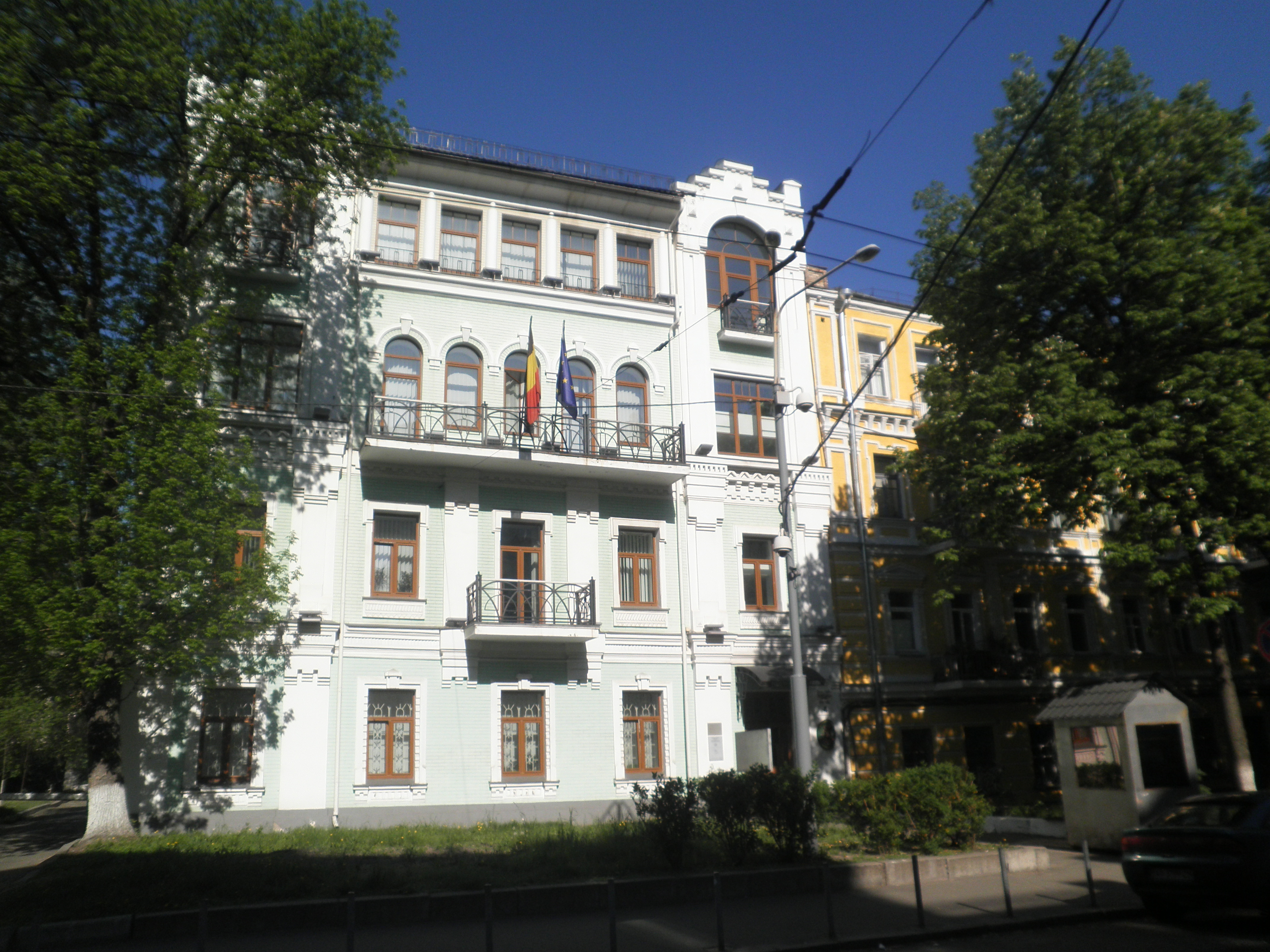
Embassy in Kyiv

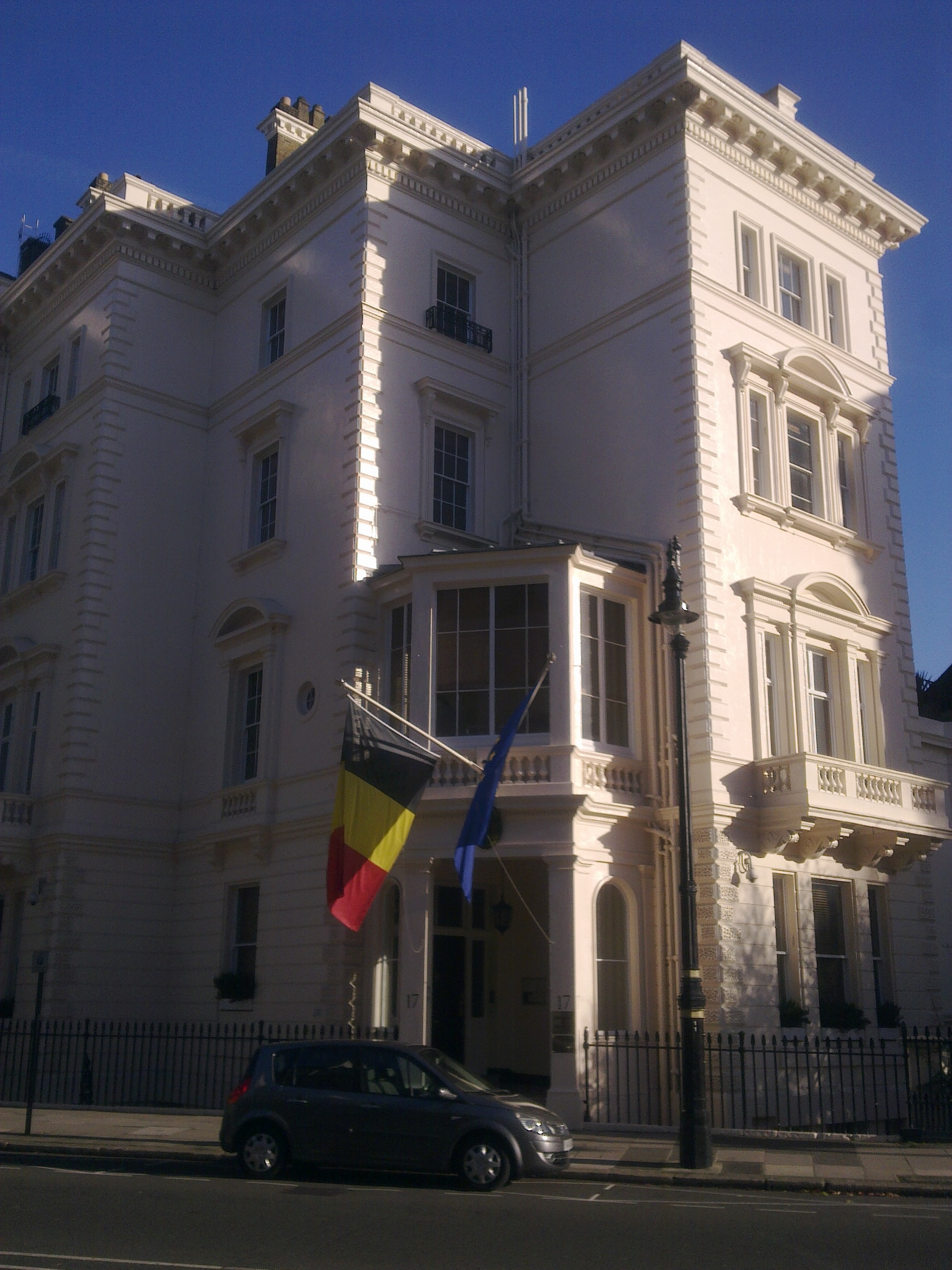
Embassy in London

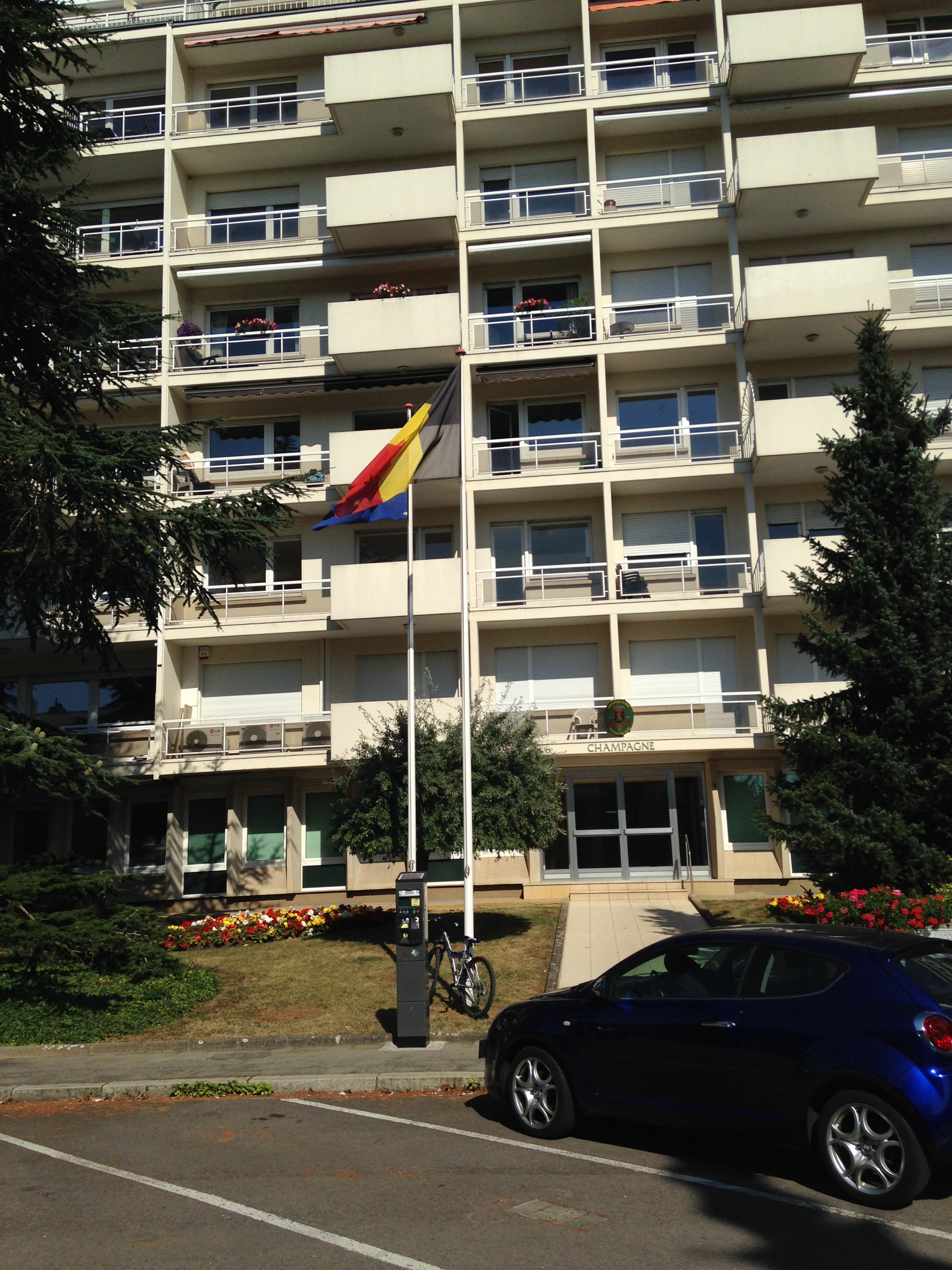
Embassy in Luxembourg

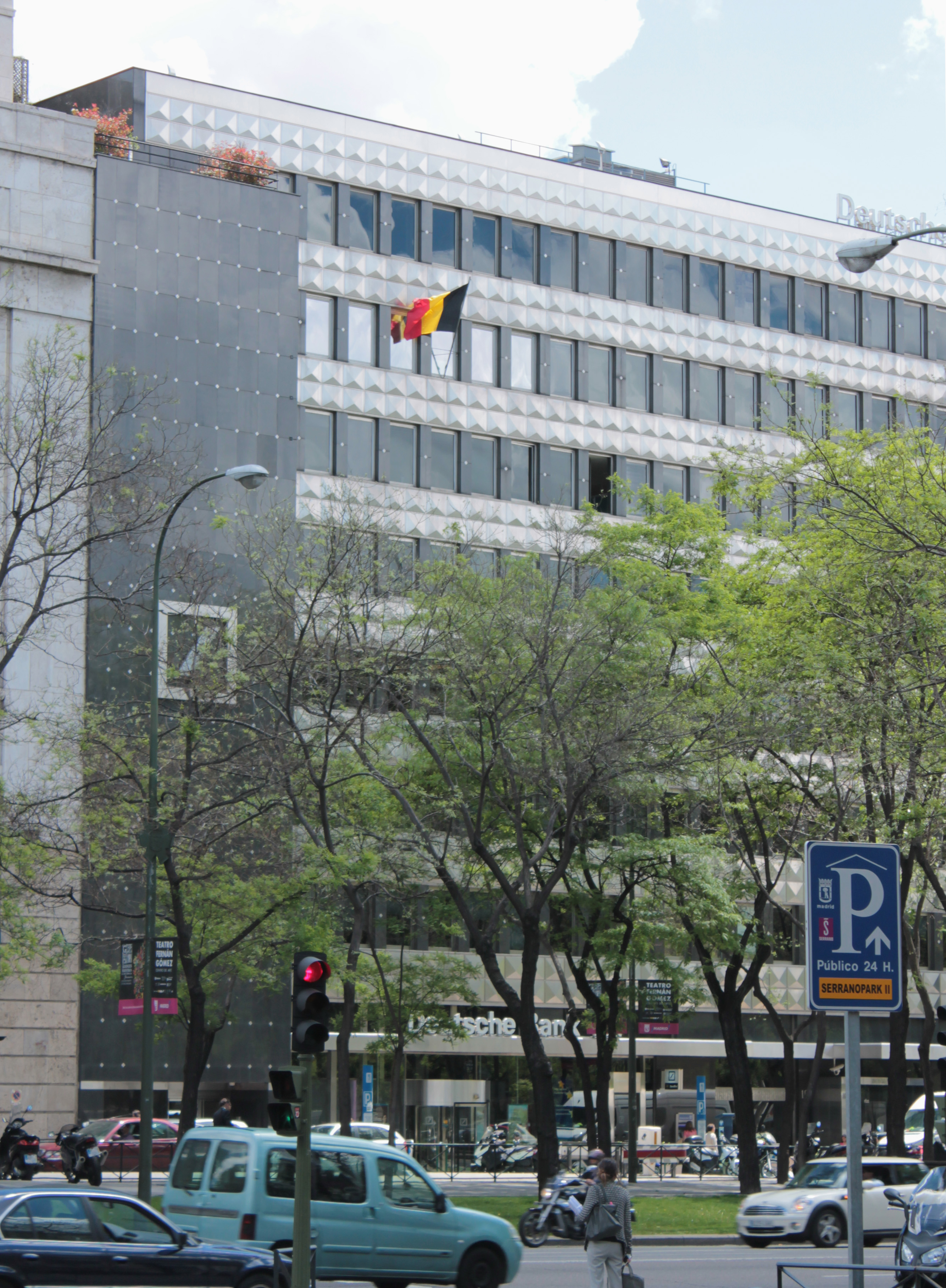
Embassy in Madrid

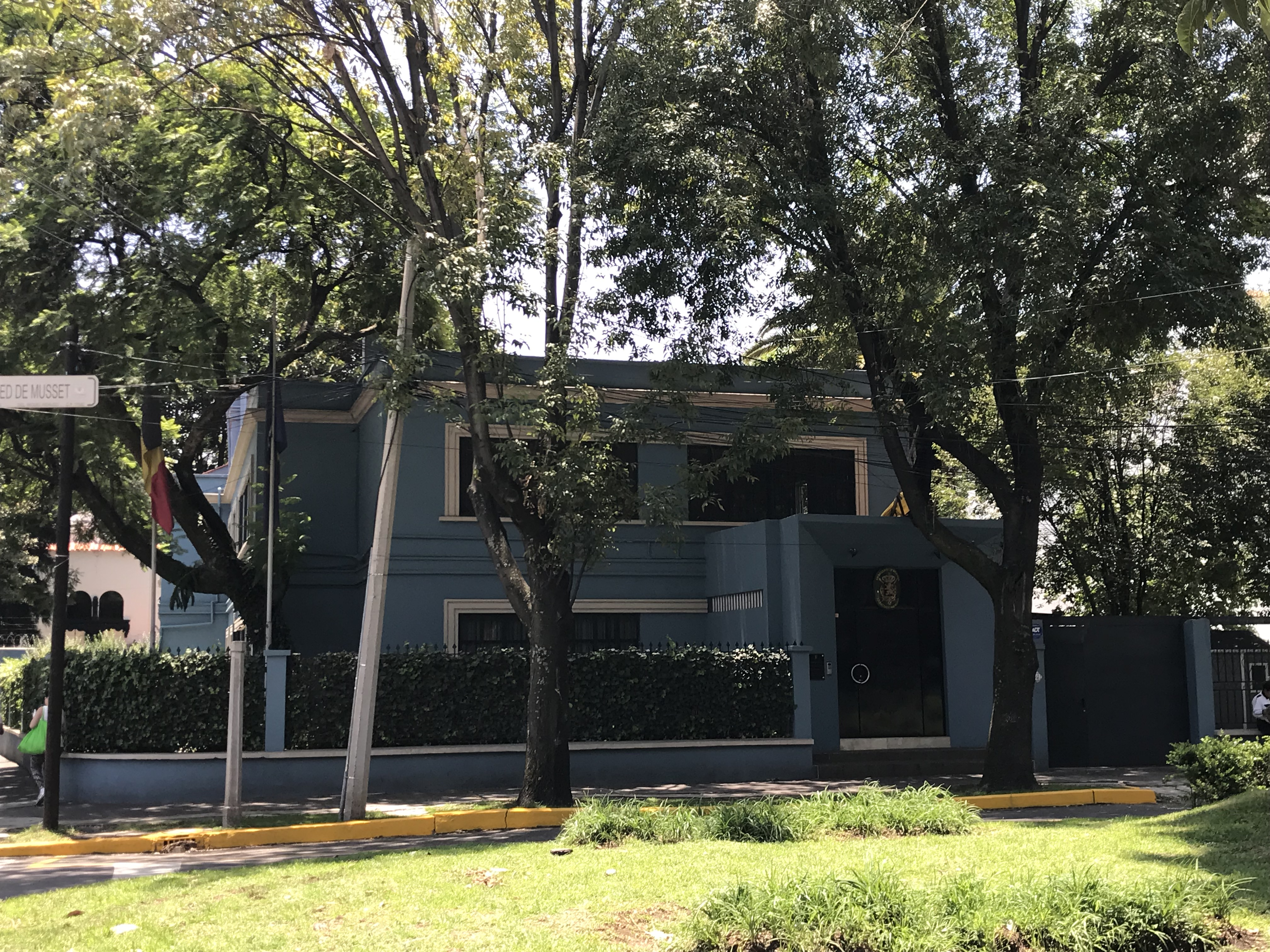
Embassy in Mexico City

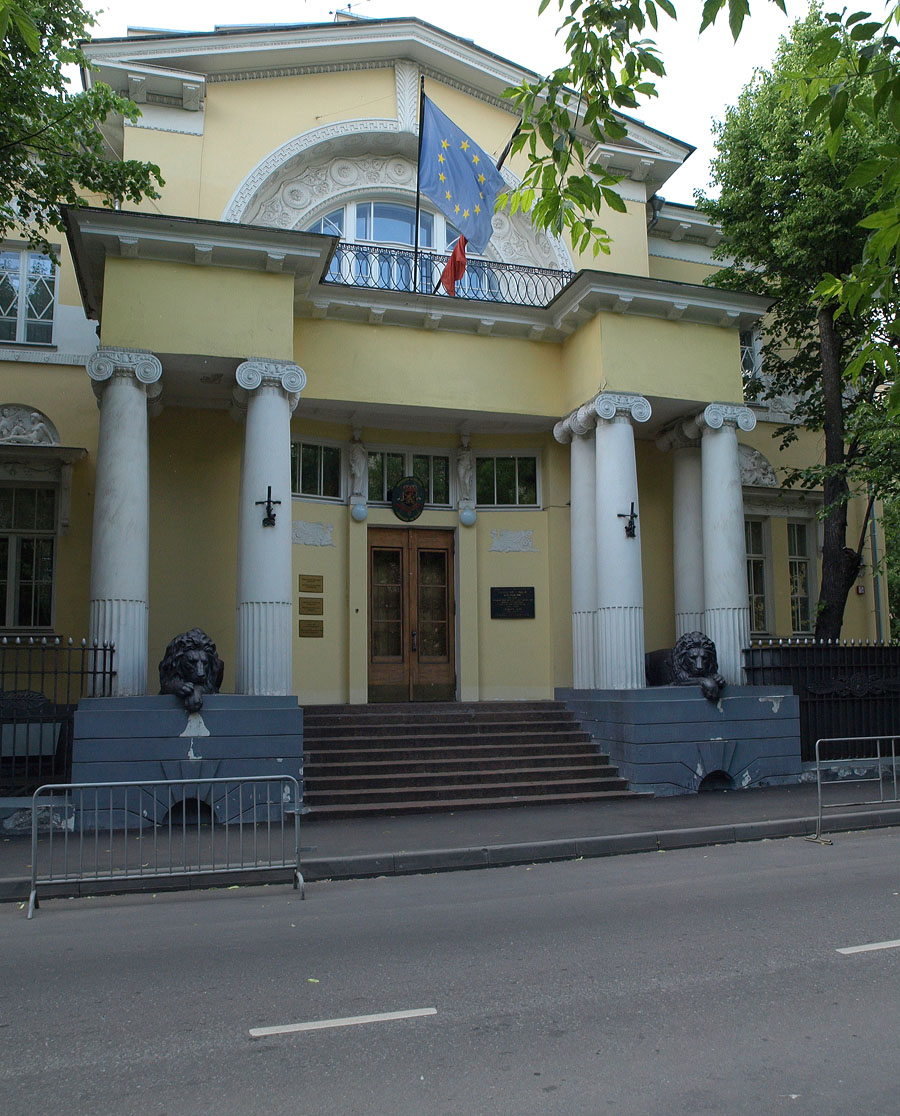
Embassy in Moscow

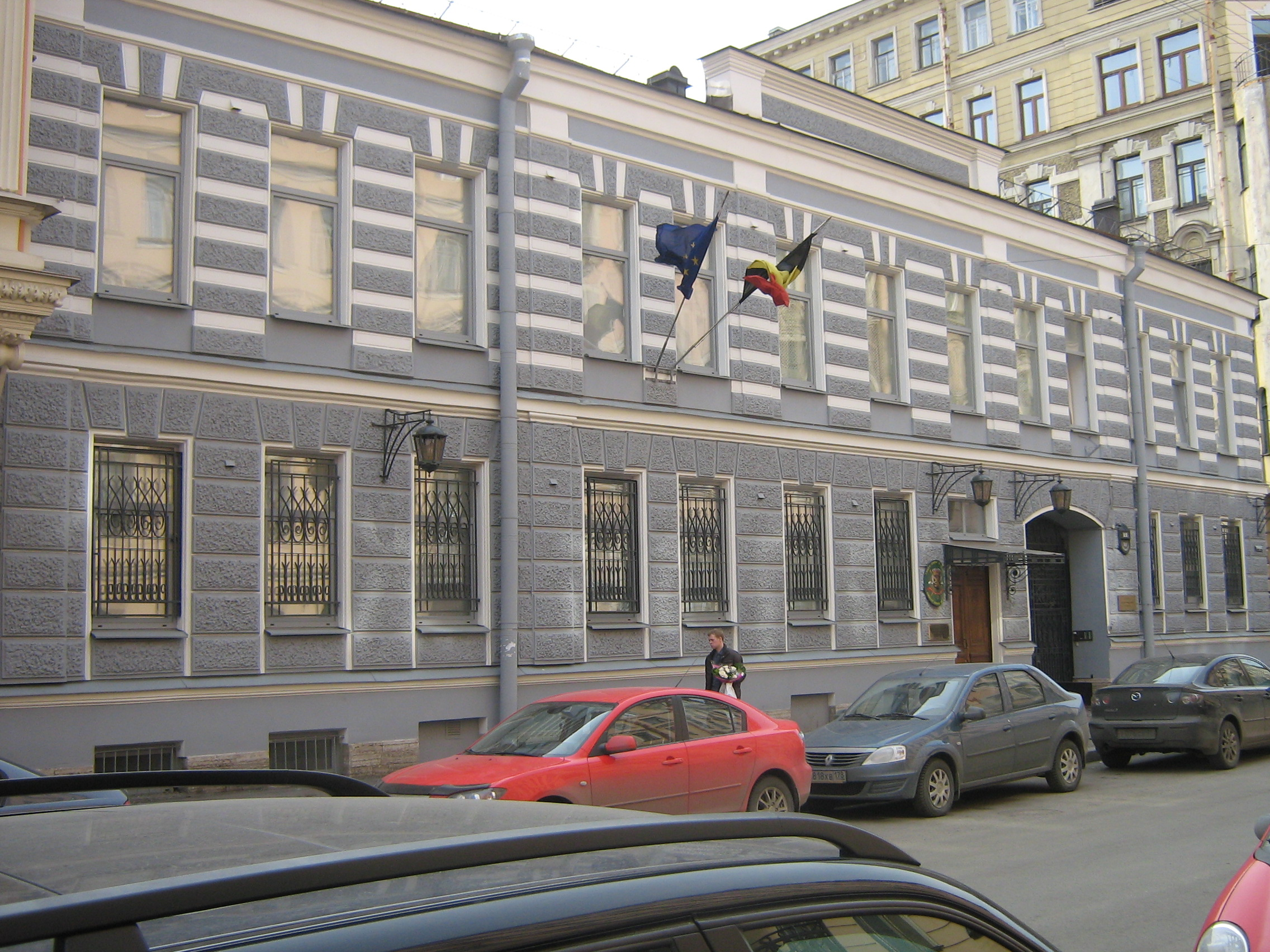
Consulate General in Saint Petersburg

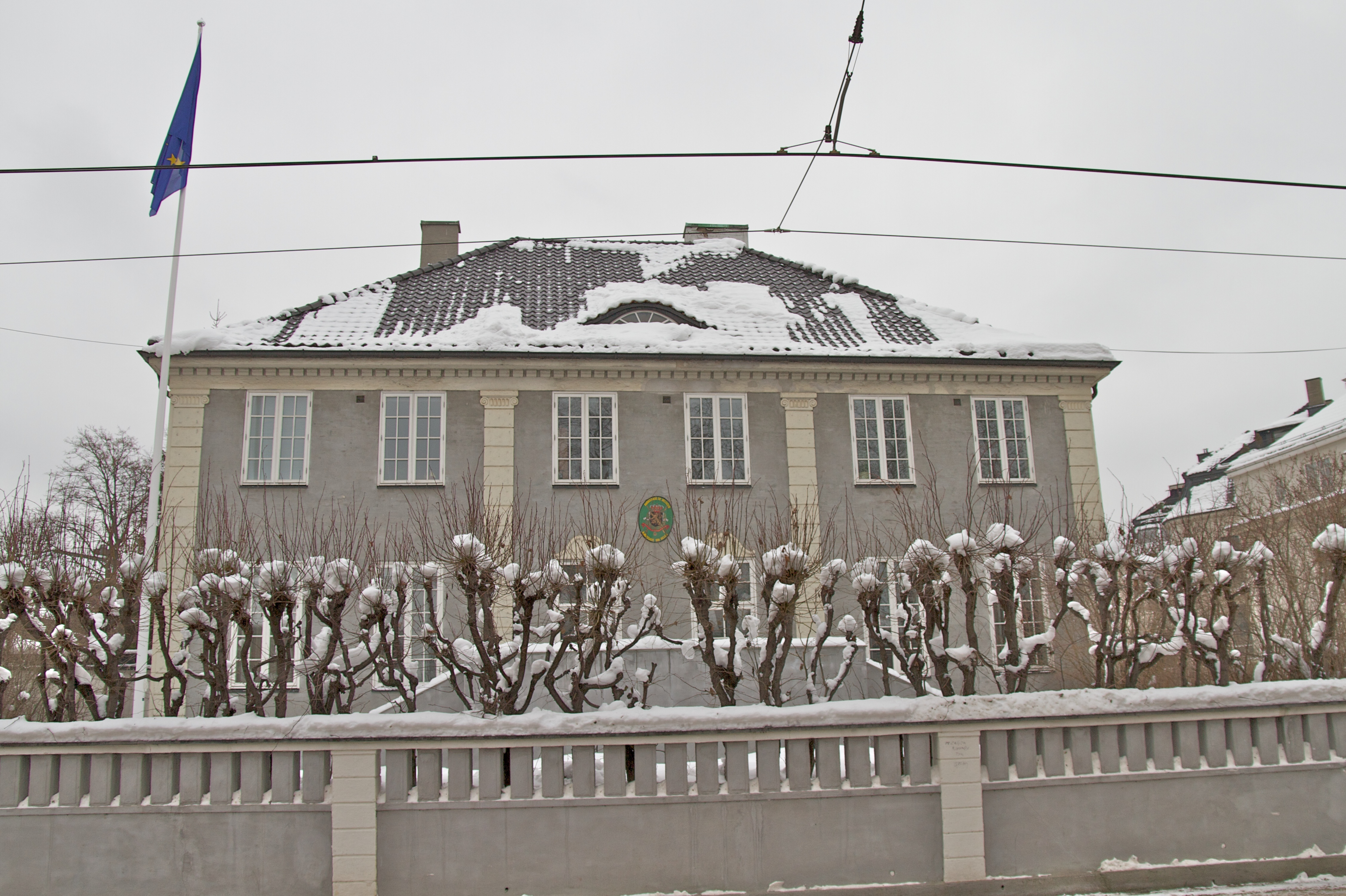
Embassy in Oslo

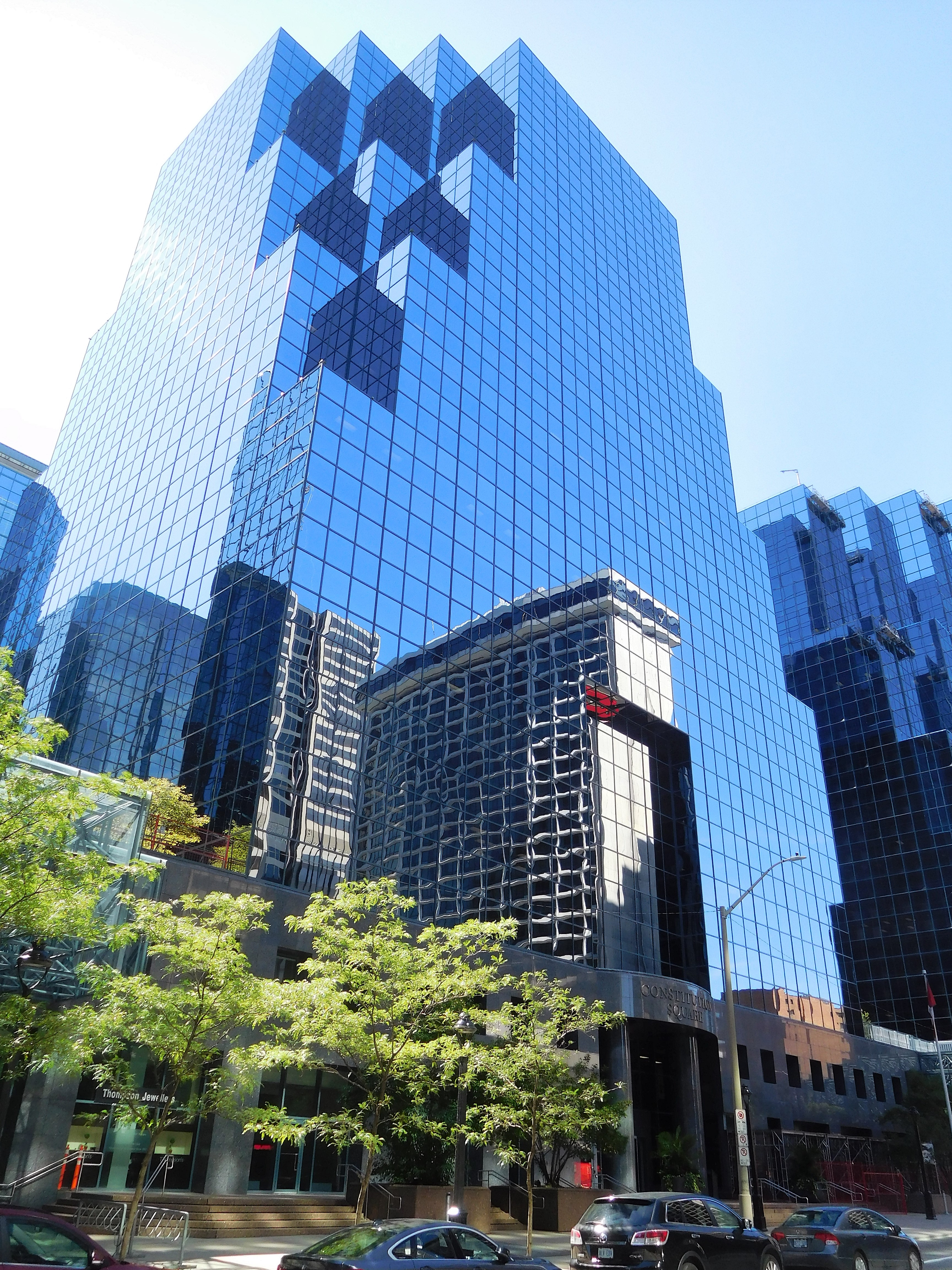
Building hosting the Embassy in Ottawa

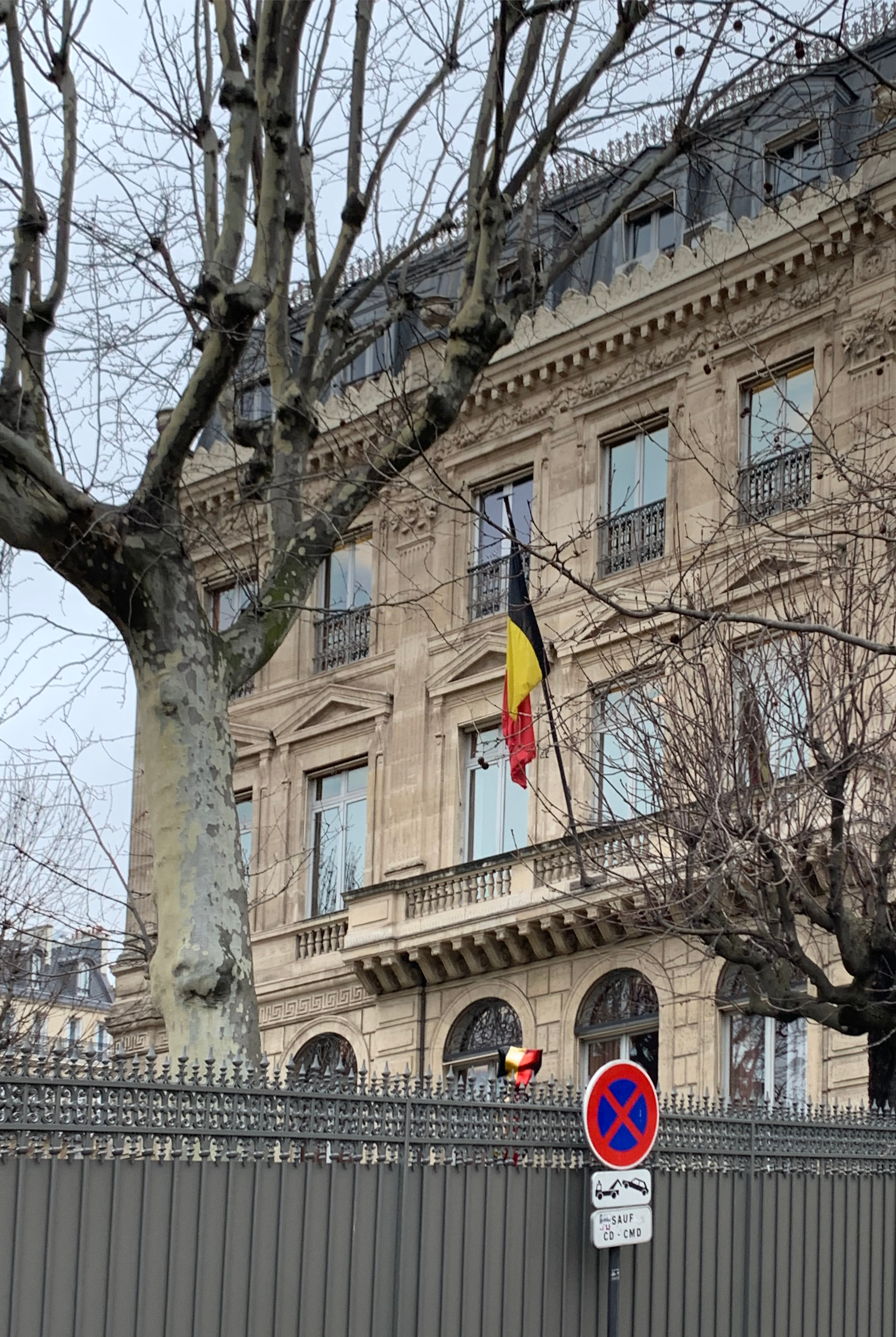
Embassy in Paris

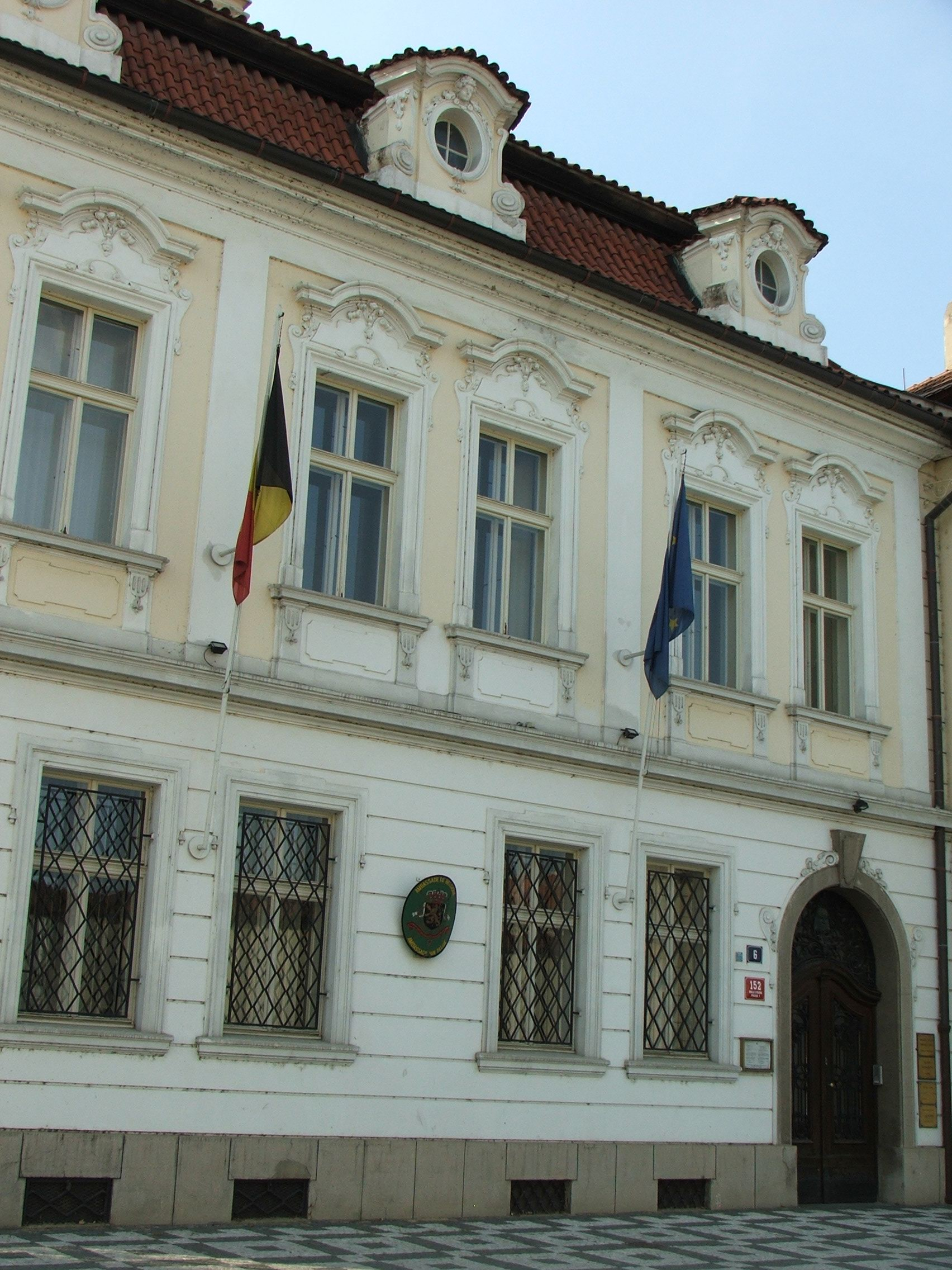
Embassy in Prague

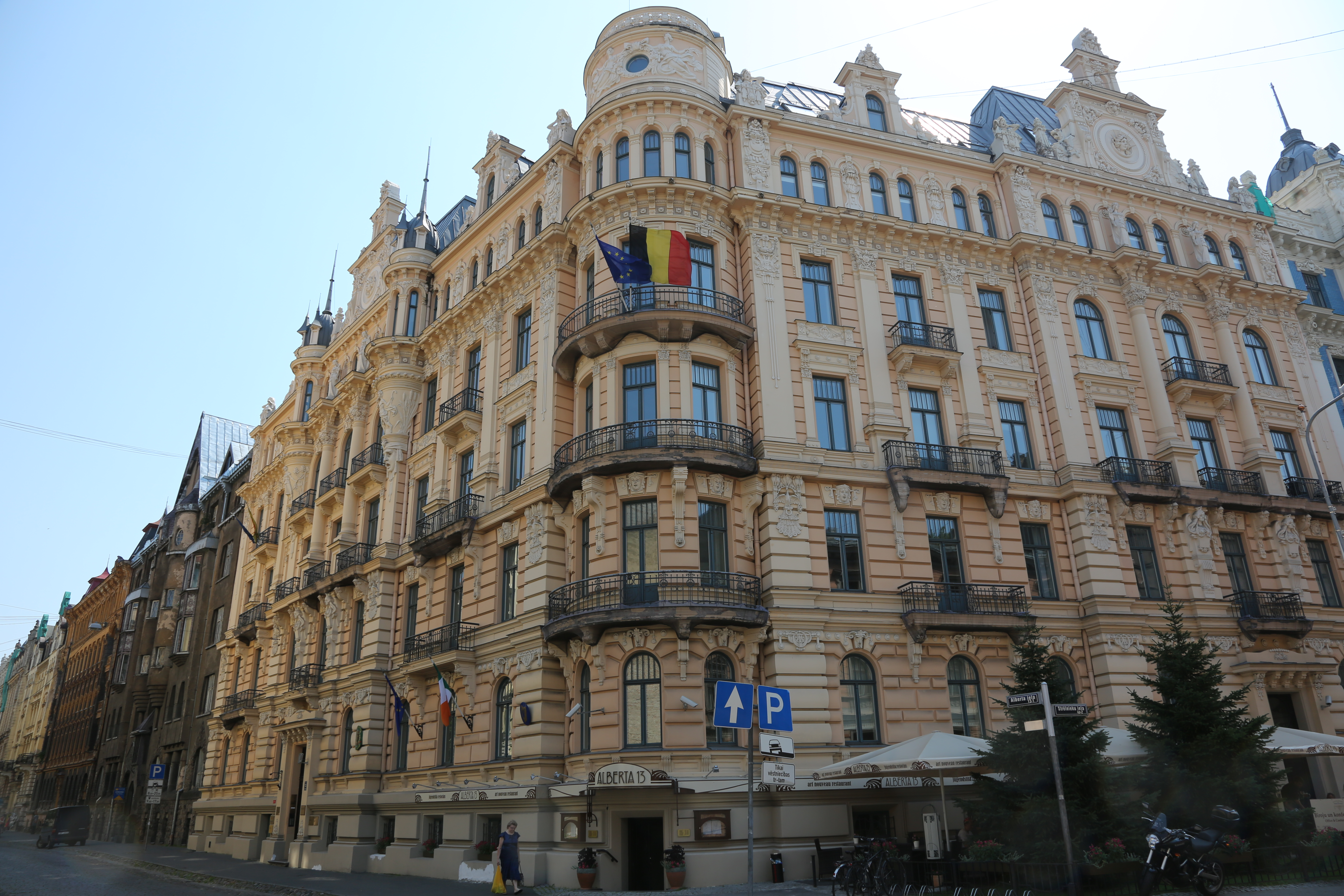
Embassy in Riga

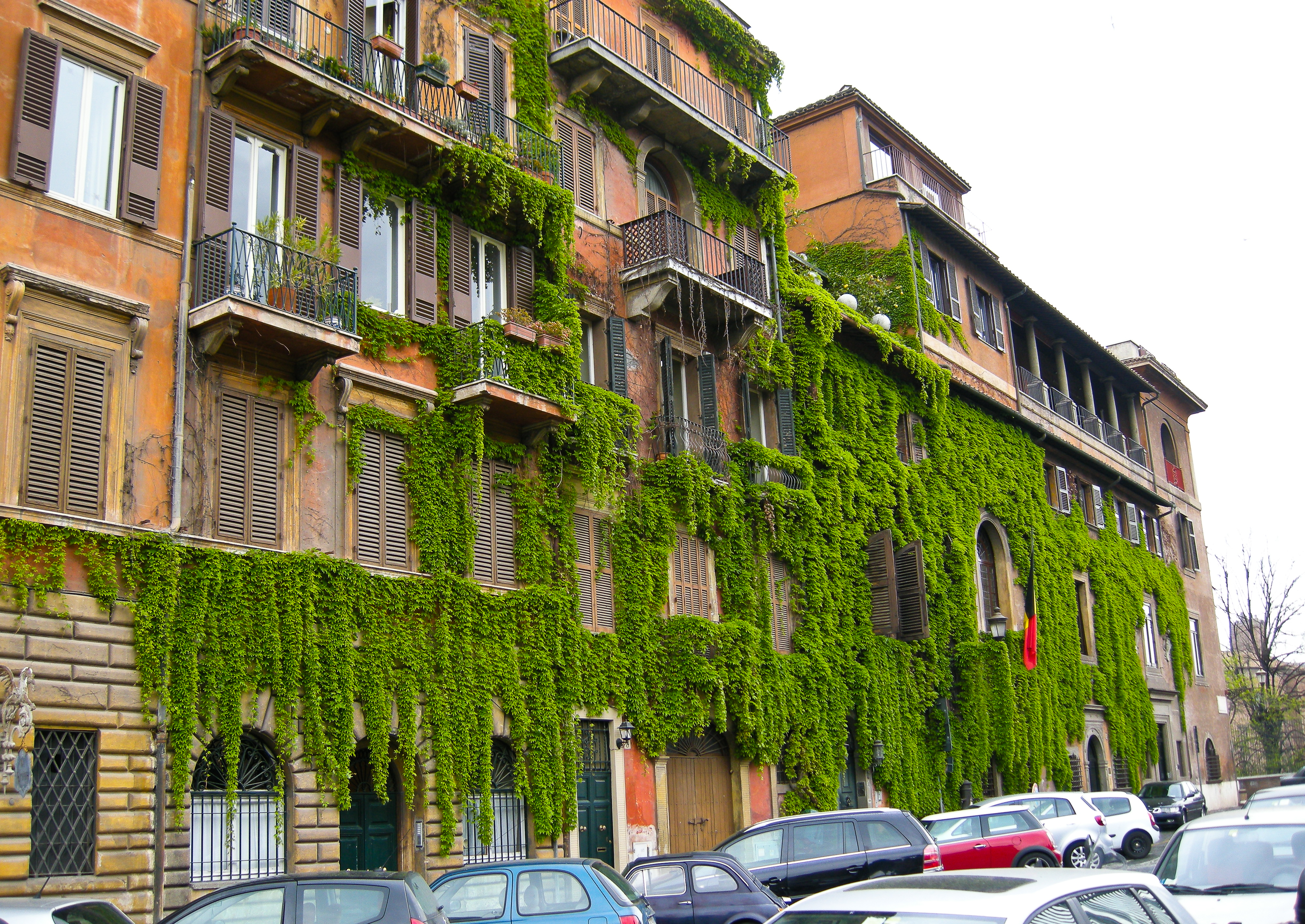
Embassy in Rome

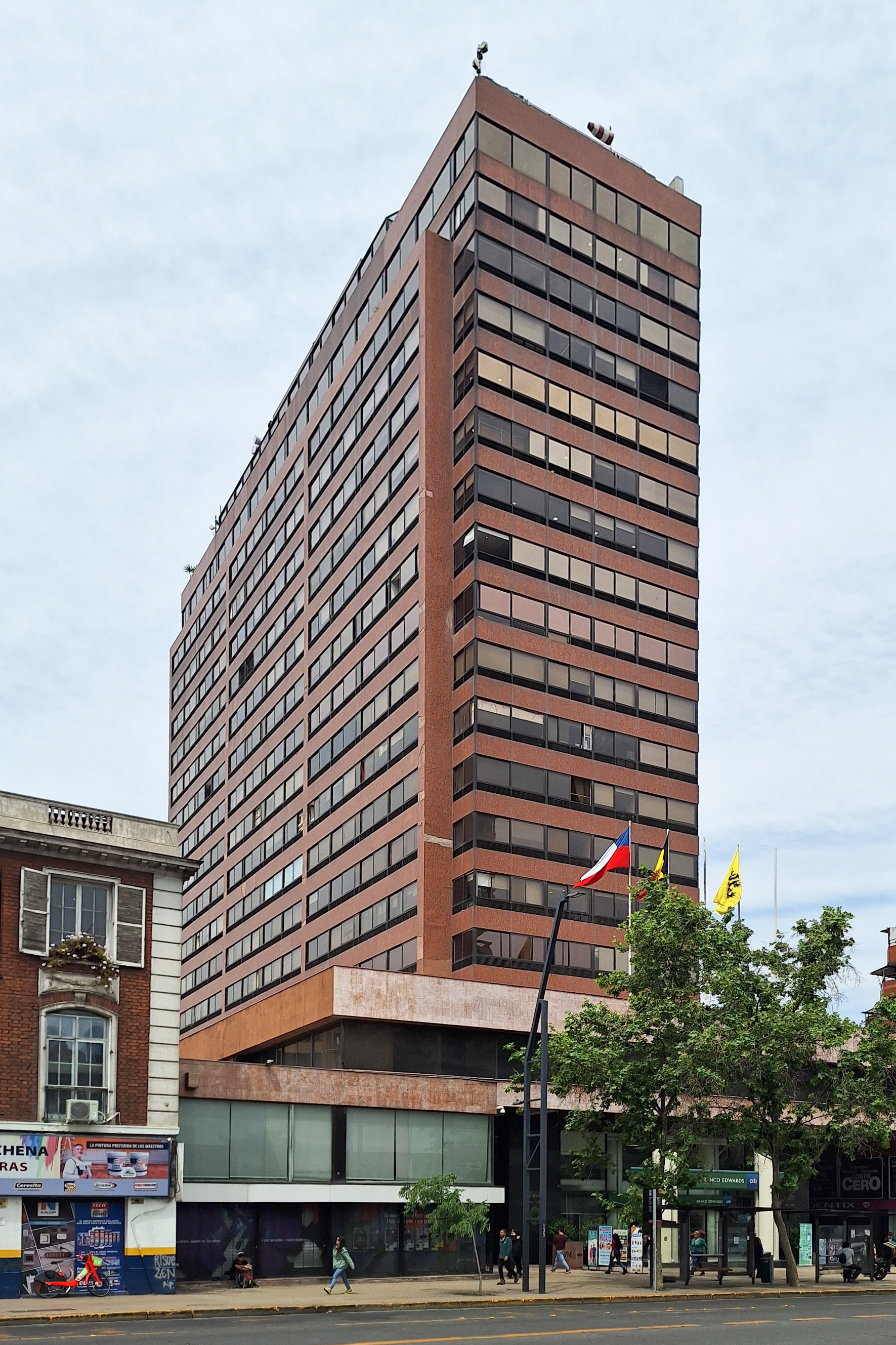
Building hosting the Embassy in Santiago

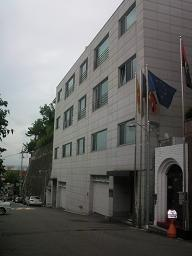
Embassy in Seoul

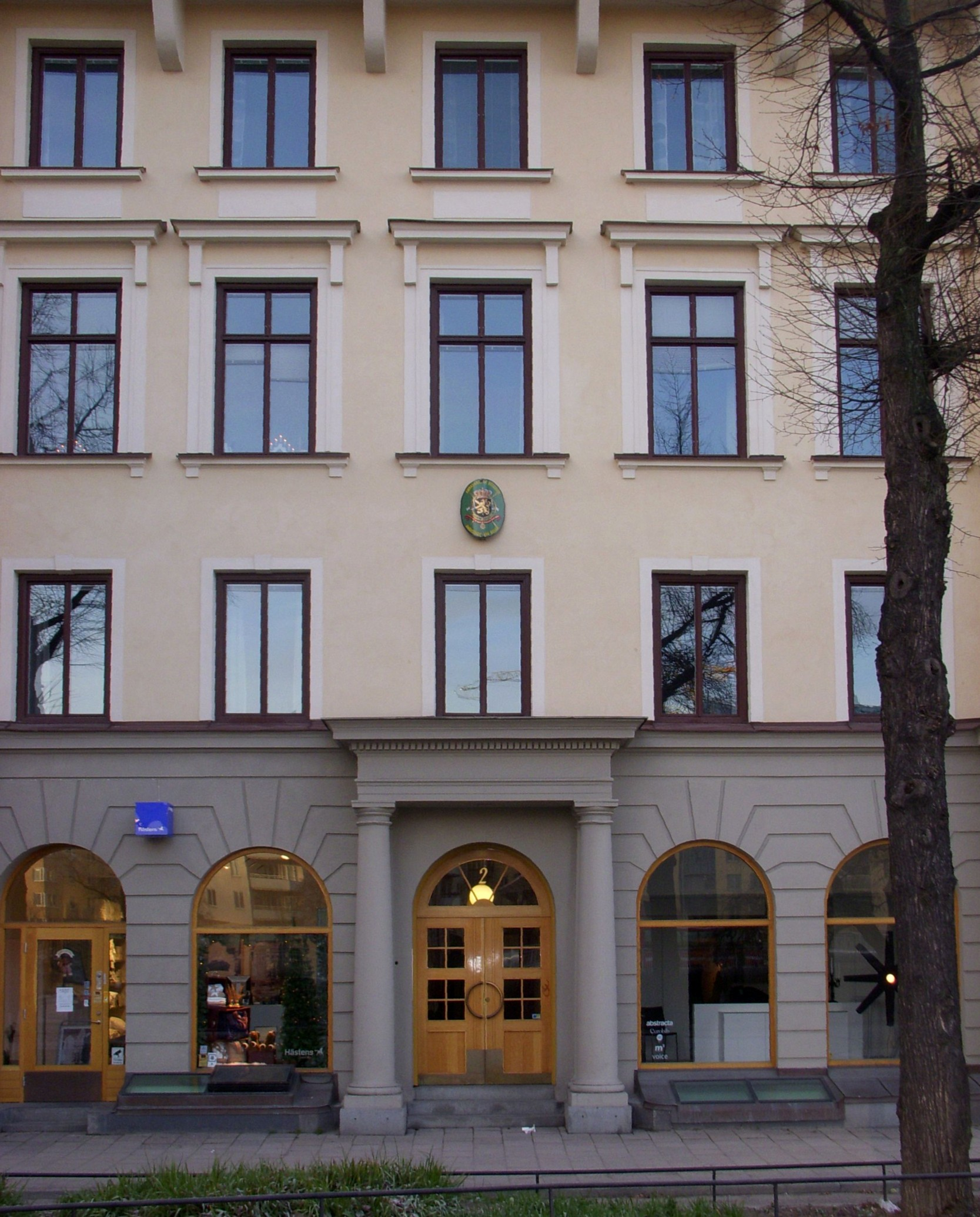
Embassy in Stockholm

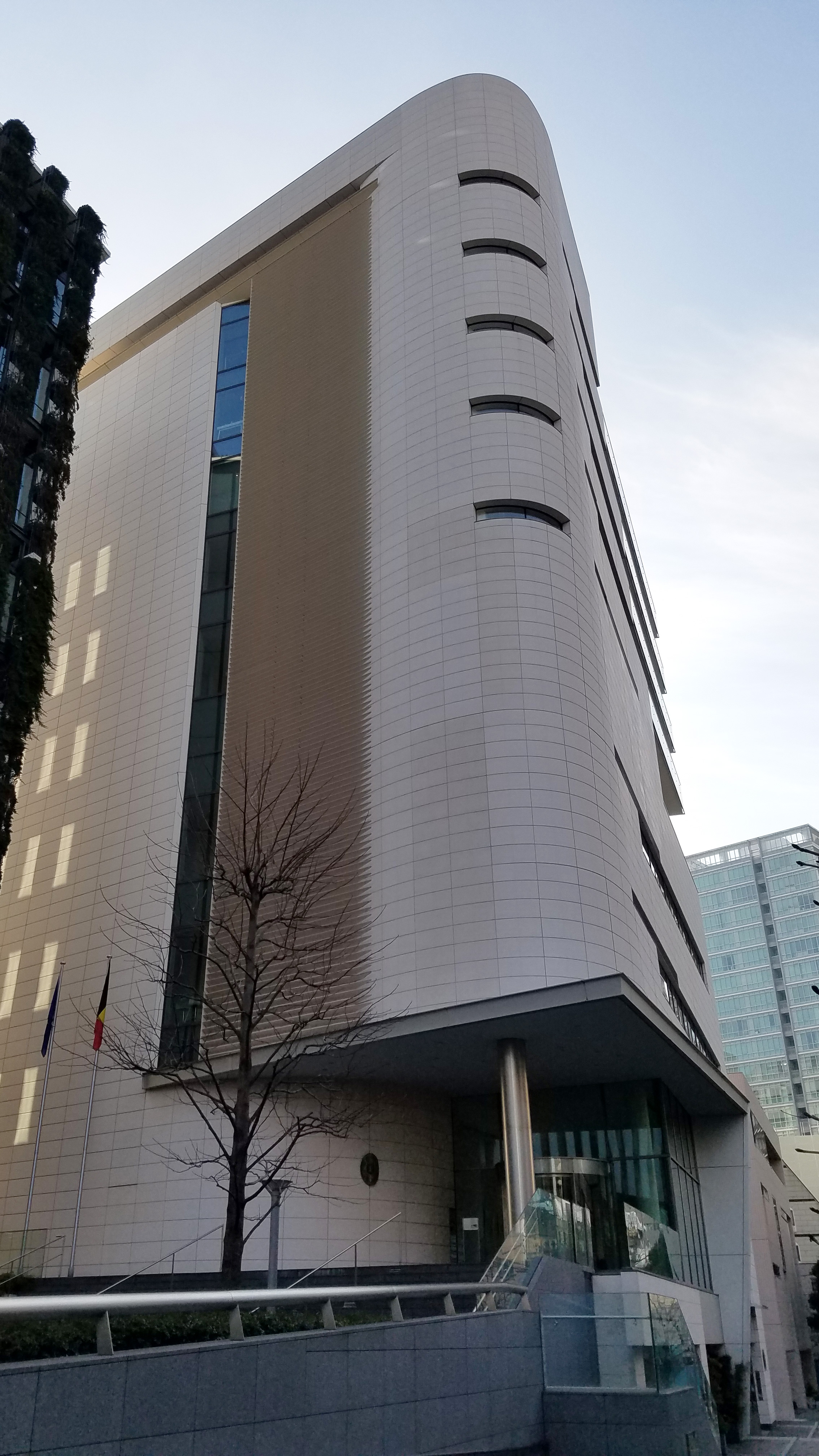
Embassy in Tokyo

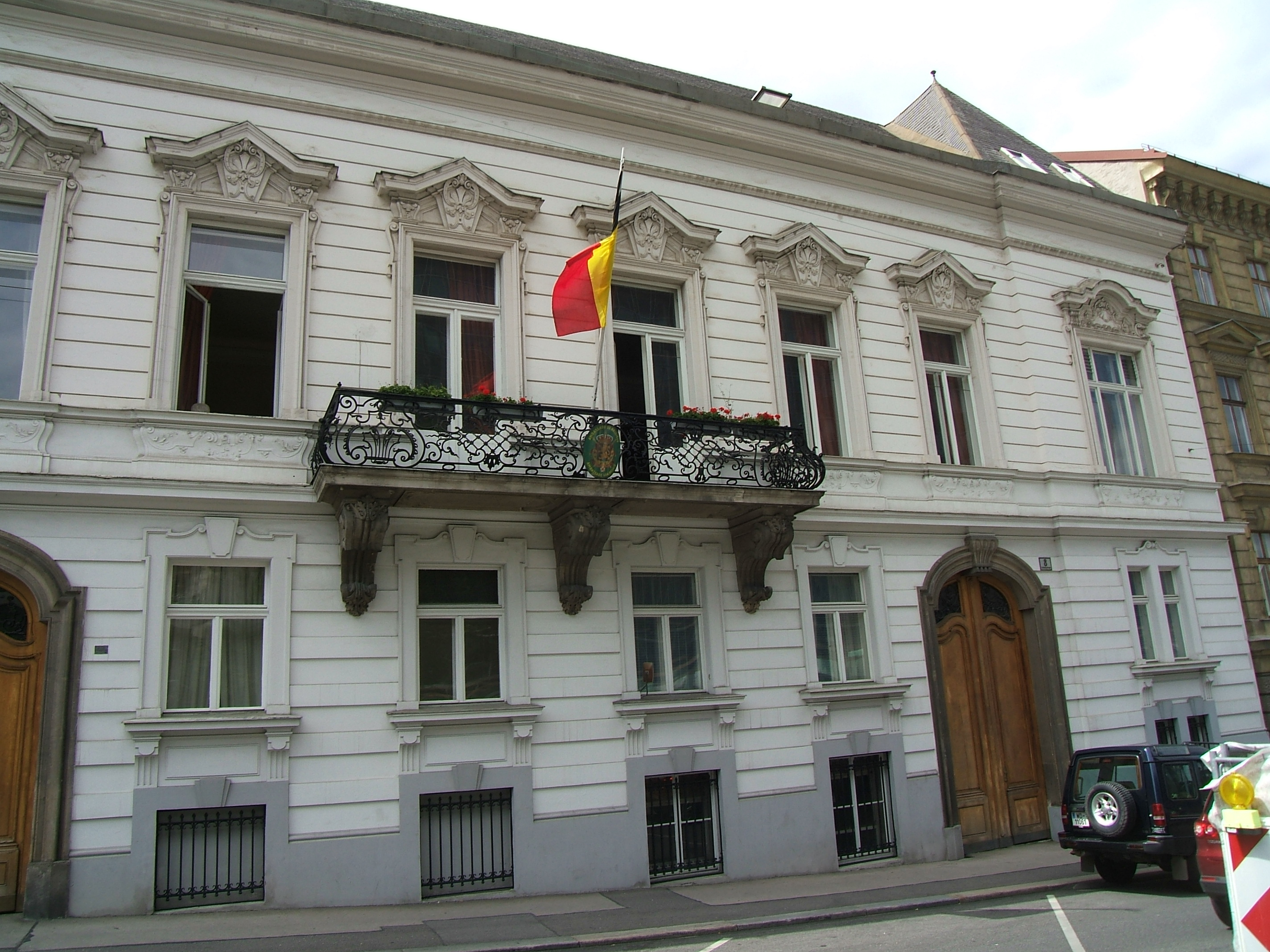
Embassy in Vienna

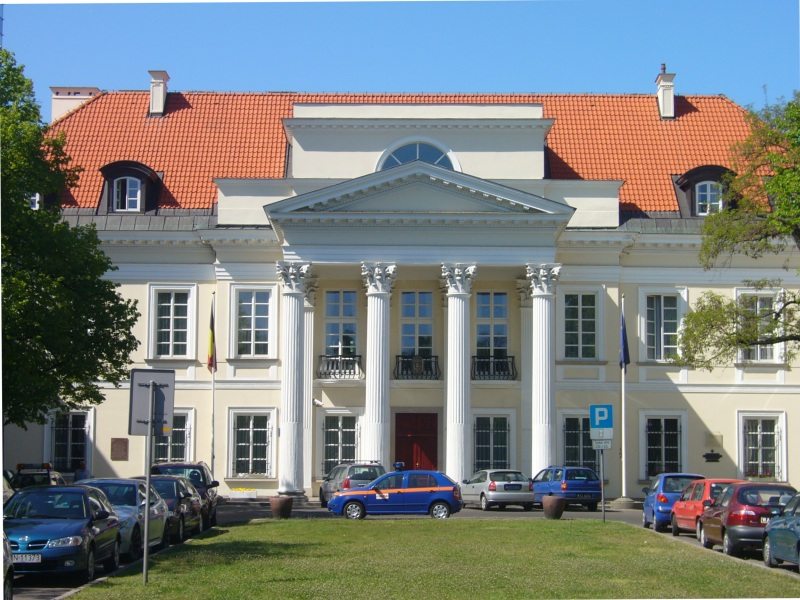
Embassy in Warsaw

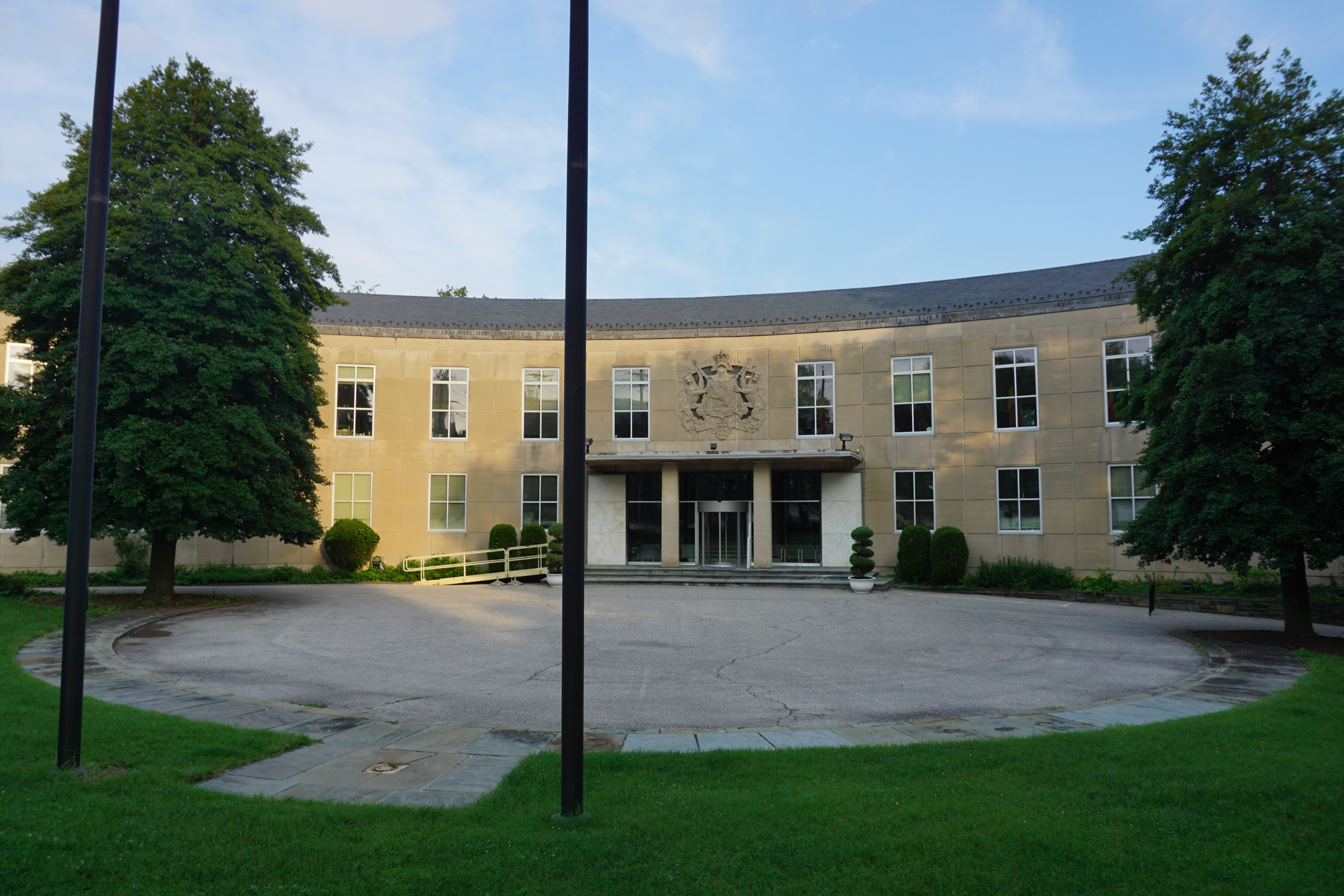
Former Embassy building in Washington, D.C.

== Closed missions ==
=== Africa ===
| Host country | Host city | Mission | Year closed | Ref. |
|---|---|---|---|---|
| Congo-Kinshasa | Bukavu | Consulate-General | 2008 | |
| Ghana | Accra | Embassy | Unknown | |
| Libya | Tripoli | Embassy | 2015 | |
| Mali | Bamako | Embassy | 2026 | |
| Morocco | Casablanca | Consulate General | 2015 | |
| Morocco | Tangier | Consulate | 2013 | |
| Rwanda | Kigali | Embassy (Note: To be reopened following the restoration of diplomatic relations.) | 2025 | |
| South Africa | Johannesburg | Consulate-General | 2015 | |
| Zimbabwe | Harare | Embassy | 2006 | |

=== Americas ===
| Host country | Host city | Mission | Year closed | Ref. |
|---|---|---|---|---|
| Bolivia | La Paz | Embassy | 2006 | |
| Brazil | Rio de Janeiro | Consulate-General | 2026 | |
| Canada | Toronto | Consulate-General | 2015 | |
| Costa Rica | San José | Consulate-General | 2013 | |
| Cuba | Havana | Embassy | 2025 | |
| Ecuador | Quito | Embassy | 2006 | |
| Venezuela | Caracas | Diplomatic office | 2021 | |

=== Asia ===
| Host country | Host city | Mission | Year closed | Ref. |
|---|---|---|---|---|
| Afghanistan | Kabul | Embassy | 2015 | |
| Bangladesh | Dhaka | Embassy | 1990 | |
| India | Chennai | Consulate-General | 2021 | |
| Iraq | Baghdad | Embassy | Unknown | |
| Syria | Damascus | Embassy | 2012 | |

=== Europe ===
| Host country | Host city | Mission | Year closed | Ref. |
|---|---|---|---|---|
| Bosnia and Herzegovina | Sarajevo | Embassy | 2026 | |
| Cyprus | Nicosia | Embassy | 2015 | |
| Estonia | Tallinn | Embassy | 2015 | |
| France | Lille | Consulate-General | 2015 | |
| France | Strasbourg | Consulate-General | 2015 | |
| Germany | Cologne | Consulate-General | 2015 | |
| Italy | Milan | Consulate | 2013 | |
| Latvia | Riga | Embassy | 2015 | |
| Lithuania | Vilnius | Embassy | 2015 | |
| Malta | Valletta | Embassy | 2013 | |
| Russia | Saint Petersburg | Consulate-General | 2022 | |
| Slovakia | Bratislava | Embassy | 2015 | |
| Slovenia | Ljubljana | Embassy | 2015 | |
| Switzerland | Geneva | Consulate-General | 2015 | |

== Missions to open ==
=== Countries ===
| Host country | Host city | Mission | Ref. |
|---|---|---|---|
| Namibia | Windhoek | Embassy | |
| Oman | Muscat | Embassy | |
| Rwanda | Kigali | Embassy | |

=== Multilateral organizations ===
| Multilateral organization | Host city | Host country | Mission | Ref. |
|---|---|---|---|---|
| African Union | Addis Ababa | Ethiopia | Permanent Mission | |

== See also ==
- Foreign relations of Belgium
- List of diplomatic missions in Belgium
- Visa policy of the Schengen Area
- Honorary consulates of Belgium
