= Consular agencies of Belgium =

The Kingdom of Belgium has 261 consular agencies. The consular agencies of Belgium aid in the issuance of passports and other identification. Though if one is not registered in the consular population center, assistance is limited. The consular agencies are led by honorary consulates appointed by the sending state.

Foreign overseas territories are included.

== Current Agencies ==
=== Africa ===
Host country	Host city	Embassy with jurisdiction	Ref.
Botswana	Gaborone	Pretoria, South Africa	
Cameroon	Douala	Yaoundé, Cameroon	
Cape Verde	Praia	Dakar, Senegal	
Central African Republic	Bangui	Yaoundé, Cameroon	
Chad	N'Djamena	Niamey, Niger	
Democratic Republic of the Congo	Goma	Kinshasa, DRC	
Democratic Republic of the Congo	Matadi	Kinshasa, DRC	
Djibouti	Djibouti City	Addis Ababa, Ethiopia	
Egypt	Sharm El Sheikh	Cairo, Egypt	
Egypt	Alexandria	Cairo, Egypt	
Egypt	Hurghada	Cairo, Egypt	
Eritrea	Asmara	Nairobi, Kenya	
Gabon	Libreville	Yaoundé, Cameroon	
Gambia	Banjul	Dakar, Senegal	
Ghana	Accra	Abidjan, Ivory Coast	
Guinea-Bissau	Bissau	Dakar, Senegal	
Kenya	Mombasa	Nairobi, Kenya	
Liberia	Monrovia	Abidjan, Ivory Coast	
Madagascar	Antananarivo	Nairobi, Kenya	
Malawi	Lilongwe	Dar es Salaam, Tanzania	
Mali	Bamako	Bamako, Mali	
Mauritania	Nouakchott	Rabat, Morocco	
Mauritius	Port Louis	Dar es Salaam, Tanzania	
Morocco	Marrakesh	Rabat, Morocco	
Morocco	Tangier	Rabat, Morocco	
Morocco	Agadir	Rabat, Morocco	
Morocco	Casablanca	Rabat, Morocco	
Mozambique	Maputo	Pretoria, South Africa	
Namibia	Windhoek	Pretoria, South Africa	
Réunion (France)	Saint-Pierre	Paris, France	
São Tomé and Príncipe	São Tomé	Luanda, Angola	
Senegal	Saint-Louis	Dakar, Senegal	
Seychelles	Victoria, Seychelles	Nairobi, Kenya	
Sierra Leone	Freetown	Abidjan, Ivory Coast	
South Africa	Durban	Pretoria, South Africa	
Sudan	Khartoum	Cairo, Egypt	
Togo	Lomé	Cotonou, Benin	
Tunisia	Djerba	Tunis, Tunisia	
Zambia	Lusaka	Dar es Salaam, Tanzania	
Zimbabwe	Harare	Pretoria, South Africa	

=== Americas ===
==== Central America and the Caribbean ====
Host country	Host city	Embassy with jurisdiction	Ref.
Bahamas	Nassau	Washington, D.C., United States	
Barbados	Bridgetown	Kingston, Jamaica	
Belize	Belize City	Mexico City, Mexico	
Costa Rica	San José	Panama City, Panama	
Dominica	Roseau	Kingston, Jamaica	
Dominican Republic	Puerto Plata	Havana, Cuba	
El Salvador	San Salvador	Panama City, Panama	
Guadeloupe, (France)	Pointe-à-Pitre Bay	Paris, France	
Guatemala	Guatemala City	Panama City, Panama	
Haiti	Port-au-Prince	Havana, Cuba	
Honduras	San Pedro Sula	Panama City, Panama	
Martinique (France)	Fort-de-France	Paris, France	
Nicaragua	Managua	Panama City, Panama	
Puerto Rico	San Juan	Washington, D.C., United States	
Trinidad and Tobago	Port of Spain	Kingston, Jamaica	

==== North America ====
Host country	Host city	Embassy with jurisdiction	Ref.
Bermuda (United Kingdom)	Hamilton	None	
Canada	Vancouver	Ottawa, Canada	
Canada	Winnipeg	Ottawa, Canada	
Canada	Toronto	Ottawa, Canada	
Canada	Quebec	Ottawa, Canada	
Canada	Halifax	Ottawa, Canada	
Greenland	Nuuk	Copenhagen, Denmark	
Mexico	Puebla	Mexico City, Mexico	
Mexico	Monterrey	Mexico City, Mexico	
Mexico	Chihuahua City	Mexico City, Mexico	
Mexico	Cancún	Mexico City, Mexico	
Mexico	Veracruz	Mexico City, Mexico	
United States	Milwaukee	Washington, D.C., United States	
United States	Baltimore	Washington, D.C., United States	
United States	Boston	Washington, D.C., United States	
United States	Chicago	Washington, D.C., United States	
United States	Cincinnati	Washington, D.C., United States	
United States	Columbia	Washington, D.C., United States	
United States	Denver	Washington, D.C., United States	
United States	Detroit	Washington, D.C., United States	
United States	Honolulu	Washington, D.C., United States	
United States	Jackson	Washington, D.C., United States	
United States	Kansas City	Washington, D.C., United States	
United States	Las Vegas	Washington, D.C., United States	
United States	Miami	Washington, D.C., United States	
United States	San Antonio	Washington, D.C., United States	
United States	Moline	Washington, D.C., United States	
United States	New Orleans	Washington, D.C., United States	
United States	Norfolk	Washington, D.C., United States	
United States	Philadelphia	Washington, D.C., United States	
United States	Phoenix	Washington, D.C., United States	
United States	Pittsburgh	Washington, D.C., United States	
United States	Portland	Washington, D.C., United States	
United States	Raleigh	Washington, D.C., United States	
United States	Saint Paul	Washington, D.C., United States	
United States	St. Louis	Washington, D.C., United States	
United States	Louisville	Washington, D.C., United States	
United States	Seattle	Washington, D.C., United States	
United States	San Francisco	Washington, D.C., United States	
United States	Salt Lake City	Washington, D.C., United States	

==== South America ====
Host country	Host city	Embassy with jurisdiction	Ref.
Argentina	Resistencia	Buenos Aires, Argentina	
Argentina	Mar del Plata	Buenos Aires, Argentina	
Argentina	Mendoza	Buenos Aires, Argentina	
Bolivia	Santa Cruz de la Sierra	Lima, Peru	
Bolivia	La Paz	Lima, Peru	
Brazil	Manaus	Brasília, Brazil	
Brazil	Goiânia	Brasília, Brazil	
Brazil	Fortaleza	Brasília, Brazil	
Brazil	Curitiba	Brasília, Brazil	
Brazil	Belo Horizonte	Brasília, Brazil	
Brazil	Recife	Brasília, Brazil	
Brazil	Porto Alegre	Brasília, Brazil	
Brazil	Salvador	Brasília, Brazil	
Chile	Punta Arenas	Santiago, Chile	
Chile	Osorno	Santiago, Chile	
Chile	Arica	Santiago, Chile	
Chile	Antofagasta	Santiago, Chile	
Chile	Valparaíso	Santiago, Chile	
Colombia	Barranquilla	Bogotá, Colombia	
Colombia	Cali	Bogotá, Colombia	
Colombia	Cartagena	Bogotá, Colombia	
Colombia	Medellín	Bogotá, Colombia	
Curaçao	Willemstad	Bogotá, Colombia	
Ecuador	Guayaquil	Lima, Peru	
Ecuador	Quito	Lima, Peru	
Guyana	Georgetown	Kingston, Jamaica	
Paraguay	Asunción	Buenos Aires, Argentina	
Peru	Arequipa	Lima, Peru	
Peru	Cusco	Lima, Peru	
Suriname	Paramaribo	Kingston, Jamaica	
Uruguay	Montevideo	Buenos Aires, Argentina	

=== Asia ===
Host country	Host city	Embassy with jurisdiction	Ref.
Armenia	Yerevan	Yerevan, Armenia	
Bahrain	Manama	Kuwait City, Kuwait	
Bangladesh	Dhaka	New Delhi, India	
Bhutan	Thimphu	New Delhi, India	
Brunei	Bandar Seri Begawan	Kuala Lumpur, Malaysia	
Cambodia	Phnom Penh	Bangkok, Thailand	
Georgia	Tbilisi	Baku, Azerbaijan	
India	Hyderabad	New Delhi, India	
India	Kolkata	New Delhi, India	
Indonesia	Surabaya	Jakarta, Indonesia	
Israel	Eilat	Tel Aviv, Israel	
Israel	Haifa	Tel Aviv, Israel	
Kazakhstan	Almaty	Astana, Kazakhstan	
Kyrgyzstan	Bishkek	Astana, Kazakhstan	
Laos	Vientiane	Bangkok, Thailand	
Malaysia	Kota Kinabalu	Kuala Lumpur, Malaysia	
Maldives	Male	New Delhi, India	
Mongolia	Ulaanbaatar	Beijing, China	
Myanmar	Yangon	Bangkok, Thailand	
Nepal	Kathmandu	New Delhi, India	
Oman	Muscat	Riyadh, Saudi Arabia	
Pakistan	Karachi	Islamabad, Pakistan	
Pakistan	Lahore	Islamabad, Pakistan	
Philippines	Cebu City	Manila, Philippines	
Saudi Arabia	Jeddah	Riyadh, Saudi Arabia	
South Korea	Busan	Seoul, Saudi Arabia	
Sri Lanka	Colombo	New Delhi, India	
Syria	Aleppo	Latakia, Syria	
Syria	Latakia	Latakia, Syria	
Tajikistan	Dushanbe	Astana, Kazakhstan	
Thailand	Chiang Mai	Bangkok, Thailand	
Uzbekistan	Tashkent	Astana, Kazakhstan	
Vietnam	Ho Chi Minh City	Hanoi, Vietnam	

=== Europe ===
Host country	Host city	Embassy with jurisdiction	Ref.
Albania	Lushnjë	Sofia, Bulgaria	
Andorra	Andorra la Vella	Madrid, Spain	
Austria	Salzburg	Vienna, Austria	
Austria	Graz	Vienna, Austria	
Austria	Innsbruck	Vienna, Austria	
Croatia	Split	Zagreb, Croatia	
Croatia	Dubrovnik	Zagreb, Croatia	
Croatia	Opatija	Zagreb, Croatia	
Cyprus	Limassol	Athens, Greece	
Denmark	Haderslev	Copenhagen, Denamark	
Denmark	Odense	Copenhagen, Denamark	
Estonia	Tallinn	Helsinki, Finland	
Finland	Tampere	Helsinki, Finland	
Finland	Oulu	Helsinki, Finland	
Finland	Turku	Helsinki, Finland	
France	Lorient	Paris, France	
France	Bordeaux	Paris, France	
France	Dijon	Paris, France	
France	Lille	Paris, France	
France	Metz	Paris, France	
France	Montpellier	Paris, France	
France	Perpignan	Paris, France	
France	Toulouse	Paris, France	
France	Tours	Paris, France	
France	Charleville-Mézières	Paris, France	
France	Lyon	Paris, France	
France	Ajaccio	Paris, France	
Germany	Munich	Berlin, Germany	
Germany	Duisburg	Berlin, Germany	
Germany	Hanover	Berlin, Germany	
Germany	Frankfurt	Berlin, Germany	
Germany	Stuttgart	Berlin, Germany	
Germany	Hamburg	Berlin, Germany	
Greece	Thessaloniki	Athens, Greece	
Greece	Patras	Athens, Greece	
Greece	Rhodes	Athens, Greece	
Greece	Ioannina	Athens, Greece	
Greece	Mytilene	Athens, Greece	
Iceland	Reykjavík	Oslo, Norway	
Ireland	Limerick	Dublin, Ireland	
Ireland	Galway	Dublin, Ireland	
Ireland	Cork	Dublin, Ireland	
Italy	Naples	Rome, Italy	
Italy	Turin	Rome, Italy	
Italy	Trieste	Rome, Italy	
Italy	Pescara	Rome, Italy	
Italy	Milan	Rome, Italy	
Italy	Florence	Rome, Italy	
Italy	Cagliari	Rome, Italy	
Italy	Bari	Rome, Italy	
Jersey	St Helier	None	
Latvia	Riga	Stockholm, Sweden	
Liechtenstein	Schaan	Bern, Switzerland	
Lithuania	Vilnius	Warsaw, Poland	
Malta	Valletta	Rome, Italy	
Moldova	Chișinău	Chișinău, Moldova	
Monaco	Monaco	Paris, France	
Montenegro	Budva	Belgrade, Serbia	
Netherlands	Rotterdam	The Hague, Netherlands	
Netherlands	Amsterdam	The Hague, Netherlands	
Netherlands	Breda	The Hague, Netherlands	
Netherlands	Maastricht	The Hague, Netherlands	
Netherlands	Raalte	The Hague, Netherlands	
Netherlands	Vlissingen	The Hague, Netherlands	
North Macedonia	Skopje	Sofia, Bulgaria	
Norway	Bergen	Oslo, Norway	
Norway	Stavanger	Oslo, Norway	
Norway	Tromsø	Oslo, Norway	
Norway	Trondheim	Oslo, Norway	
Poland	Łódź	Warsaw, Poland	
Poland	Bydgoszcz	Warsaw, Poland	
Poland	Kraków	Warsaw, Poland	
Poland	Gdynia	Warsaw, Poland	
Poland	Warsaw	Warsaw, Poland	
Portugal	Porto	Lisbon, Portugal	
Portugal	Faro	Lisbon, Portugal	
Portugal	Funchal	Lisbon, Portugal	
Portugal	Ponta Delgada	Lisbon, Portugal	
Romania	Timișoara	Bucharest, Romania	
Slovakia	Bratislava	Vienna, Austria	
Slovenia	Ljubljana	Vienna, Austria	
Spain	Málaga	Madrid, Spain	
Spain	Cartagena	Madrid, Spain	
Spain	Bilbao	Madrid, Spain	
Spain	A Coruña	Madrid, Spain	
Spain	Cádiz	Madrid, Spain	
Spain	Palma de Mallorca	Madrid, Spain	
Spain	Seville	Madrid, Spain	
Spain	Valencia	Madrid, Spain	
Sweden	Malmö	Stockholm, Sweden	
Switzerland	Zurich	Bern, Switzerland	
Switzerland	St. Gallen	Bern, Switzerland	
Switzerland	Lugano	Bern, Switzerland	
Switzerland	Geneva	Bern, Switzerland	
Türkiye	Antalya	Ankara, Türkiye	
Türkiye	Bodrum	Ankara, Türkiye	
Türkiye	Bursa	Ankara, Türkiye	
Türkiye	Gaziantep	Ankara, Türkiye	
Türkiye	İzmir	Ankara, Türkiye	
Ukraine	Lviv	Kyiv, Ukraine	
United Kingdom	Edinburgh	London, United Kingdom	
United Kingdom	Hull	London, United Kingdom	
United Kingdom	Manchester	London, United Kingdom	
United Kingdom	Newcastle upon Tyne	London, United Kingdom	

=== Oceania ===
Host country	Host city	Embassy with jurisdiction	Ref.
Australia	Adelaide	Canberra, Australia	
Australia	Sydney	Canberra, Australia	
Australia	Perth	Canberra, Australia	
Australia	Melbourne	Canberra, Australia	
Australia	Launceston	Canberra, Australia	
Australia	Darwin	Canberra, Australia	
Australia	Brisbane	Canberra, Australia	
Fiji	Suva	Canberra, Australia	
French Polynesia (France)	Papeete	Canberra, Australia	
Micronesia	Pohnpei	Manila, Philippines	
New Caledonia (France)	Nouméa	Canberra, Australia	
New Zealand	Auckland	Canberra, Australia	
New Zealand	Wellington	Canberra, Australia	
New Zealand	Christchurch	Canberra, Australia	
Palau	Koror	Manila, Philippines	
Papua New Guinea	Port Moresby	Canberra, Australia	
Vanuatu	Port Vila	Canberra, Australia	
