= List of ambassadors from Belgium =

This is a list of ambassadors from Belgium with their respective postings around the world.

Host Country	Location	Ambassador
Algeria	Algiers	Jean-Jacques Quairiat
Andorra	Embassy with jurisdiction: Spain (Madrid)	
Angola	Luanda	Daniel Dargent
Argentina	Buenos Aires	Koenraad Rouvroy
Australia	Canberra	Frank Carruet
Austria	Vienna	Claude Rijmenans (2007-)
Belize	Embassy with jurisdiction: Mexico (Mexico City)	
Bolivia	Embassy with jurisdiction: Peru (Lima)	
Bosnia and Herzegovina	Embassy with jurisdiction: Austria (Vienna)	
Brazil	Brasília	Johan Ballegeer
Brunei	Embassy with jurisdiction: Singapore (Singapore)	
Bulgaria	Sofia	Philippe Beke
Burkina Faso	Ouagadougou	Daniel Bertrand
Burundi	Bujumbura	François Cornet d'Elzius
Cameroon	Embassy with jurisdiction: Congo (Brazzaville)	
Canada	Ottawa	Jean Lint
Chile	Santiago de Chile	Francis De Sutter
China	Beijing	Bernard Pierre
Colombia	Bogota	Joris Couvreur
Democratic Republic of the Congo	Kinshasa	Dominique Struye de Swielande (2009-)
Republic of the Congo	Brazzaville	Michel Tilemans
Cook Islands	Embassy with jurisdiction: Australia (Canberra)	
Costa Rica	San José	Olivier Gillès de Pélichy
Côte d'Ivoire	Abidjan	Dirk Verheyen
Croatia	Zagreb	Marc de Schoutheete de Tervarent
Cuba	Havana	Claudia Maesschalck
Cyprus	Nicosia	Bruno van der Pluijm (2007-)
Czech Republic	Prague	Rafaël Van Hellemont
Denmark	Copenhagen	Marc Van Craen
Djibouti	Embassy with jurisdiction: Ethiopia (Addis Ababa)	
Ecuador	Embassy with jurisdiction: Peru (Lima)	
Egypt	Cairo	Daniel Leroy
El Salvador	Embassy with jurisdiction: Costa Rica (San José)	
Equatorial Guinea	Embassy with jurisdiction: Congo (Brazzaville)	
Ethiopia	Addis Ababa	Gunther Sleeuwagen (2007-)
Fiji	Embassy with jurisdiction: Australia (Canberra)	
Finland	Helsinki	Guido Courtois
France	Paris	Baudouin de la Kethulle de Ryhove
Gabon	Embassy with jurisdiction: Congo (Brazzaville)	
Germany	Berlin	Mark Geleyn
Greece	Athens	Marc van den Reeck
Guatemala	Embassy with jurisdiction: Costa Rica (San José)	
Hungary	Budapest	Pierre Labouverie
India	New Delhi	Pierre Vaesen
Indonesia	Jakarta	Marc Trenteseau
Iran	Teheran	Hervé Goyens
Ireland	Dublin	Leopold Carrewyn
Israel	Tel-Aviv	Danielle Guilbert
Italy	Rome	Jan De Bock
Japan	Tokyo	Johan Maricou
Jordan	Amman	Johan Indekeu (2007-)
Kenya	Nairobi	Igor Haustrate
Kiribati	Embassy with jurisdiction: Australia (Canberra)	
Latvia	Embassy with jurisdiction: Sweden (Stockholm)	
Lebanon	Beirout	Johan Verkammen
Libya	Tripoli	Alphonse Creusen
Lithuania	Vilnius	Filip Cumps
Luxembourg	Luxembourg	
Malawi	Embassy with jurisdiction: Tanzania (Dar es Salaam)	
Malaysia	Kuala Lumpur	Daniel Dargent
Malta	Valletta	Thomas Baekelandt
Mauritius	Embassy with jurisdiction: Tanzania (Dar es Salaam)	
Mexico	Mexico City	Gustaaf Dierckx (2007-)
Montenegro	Embassy with jurisdiction: Serbia (Belgrade)	
Morocco	Rabat	Patrick Vercauteren Drubbel
Nauru	Embassy with jurisdiction: Australia (Canberra)	
Nepal	Embassy with jurisdiction: India (New Delhi)	
Netherlands	The Hague	Luc Carbonez
New Zealand	Embassy with jurisdiction: Australia (Canberra)	
Nigeria	Abuja	Michel Dewez
Norway	Oslo	Christian Monnoyer
Pakistan	Islamabad	Michel Goffin
Panama	Embassy with jurisdiction: Costa Rica (San José)	
Papua New Guinea	Embassy with jurisdiction: Australia (Canberra)	
Paraguay	Embassy with jurisdiction: Argentina (Buenos Aires)	
Peru	Lima	Marie-Louise Vanherk
Philippines	Manila	Grégoire Vardakis
Poland	Warsaw	Jan Luykx
Portugal	Lisbon	Rudy Huygelen
Romania	Bucharest	Philippe Roland
Russia	Moscow	Guy Trouveroy
Rwanda	Kigali	François Roux (2006-)
Samoa	Embassy with jurisdiction: Australia (Canberra)	
San Marino	Embassy with jurisdiction: Italy (Rome)	
São Tomé and Príncipe	Embassy with jurisdiction: Congo (Brazzaville)	
Saudi Arabia	Riyad	Rudi Schellinck
Senegal	Dakar	Georges Godart (2007-)
Serbia	Belgrade	Alain Kundycki
Singapore	Singapore	Marc Calcoen
Slovakia	Bratislava	Alain Cools
Slovenia	Ljubljana	Louis Mouraux
South Africa	Pretoria	Hubert Cooreman
South Korea	Seoul	Victor Wei
Spain	Madrid	Johan Swinnen
Sri Lanka	Embassy with jurisdiction: India (New Delhi)	
Sudan	Embassy with jurisdiction: Egypt (Cairo)	
Suriname	Embassy with jurisdiction: Venezuela (Caracas)	
Sweden	Stockholm	Carl Peeters
Switzerland	Bern	Regine De Clercq
Syria	Damascus	Dirk Loncke
Tanzania	Dar es Salaam	Peter Maddens
Thailand	Bangkok	Rudi Veestraeten
Tonga	Embassy with jurisdiction: Australia (Canberra)	
Tunisia	Tunis	Michel Carlier
Turkey	Ankara	Marc Van Rysselberghe
Tuvalu	Embassy with jurisdiction: Australia (Canberra)	
Uganda	Kampala	Jan de Bruyne
Ukraine	Kiev	Marc Vinck
United Arab Emirates	Abu Dhabi	Philippe Dartois
United Kingdom	London	Jean-Miguel Veranneman de Watervliet
United States	Washington, D.C.	Jean-Arthur Régibeau (2020–)
Uruguay	Embassy with jurisdiction: Argentina (Buenos Aires)	
Vanuatu	Embassy with jurisdiction: Australia (Canberra)	
Vatican City	Holy See	Patrick Renault (2020-)
Venezuela	Embassy with jurisdiction: Colombia	
Vietnam	Hanoi	Bruno Angelet
Zambia	Embassy with jurisdiction: Tanzania (Dar es Salaam)	

Organization	Location	Ambassador
United Nations	New York City	Jan Grauls

== See also ==
- List of ambassadors to Belgium
