= Rijmenans =

Rijmenans is a surname. Notable people with the surname include:

- Claude Rijmenans, Belgian ambassador
- Marcel Rijmenans, Belgian ambassador
