= Novisi Aku Abaidoo =

Ghanaian diplomat

Ambassador to Belgium
- In office 2 February 2016 – February 2019
- Preceded by: Morgan Adokwei Brown
- Succeeded by: Harriet Sena Siaw-Boateng

Ambassador to Benin
- In office June 2014 – 2016

Personal details
- Born: 17 June 1959 (age 67)
- Education: University of Cape Coast (BA); University of Ghana (MA)

Novisi Aku Abaidoo (born 17 June 1959) is a Ghanaian diplomat who served as Ghana's Ambassador to Belgium from 2 February 2016 to February 2019 when she was replaced by Harriet Sena Siaw-Boateng.

== Career ==
Prior to her appointment as Ghana's ambassador to Belgium, she was Ghana's Ambassador to Benin.
