= Walter Loridan =

Belgian diplomat and academic

- Walter Loridan at the 978th plenary meeting of the 15th United Nations General Assembly Session, 6 April 1961

Belgian Ambassador to the United States
- In office 1969–1974
- Monarch: Baudouin of Belgium
- Preceded by: Louis Scheyven
- Succeeded by: Willy Van Cauwenberg

Belgian Ambassador in Cologne
- In office July 1965 – 1968
- Monarch: Baudouin of Belgium
- Preceded by: Remi Baert
- Succeeded by: Claude Ruelle

Belgian Ambassador to the United Nations
- In office 1959 – July 1965
- Monarch: Baudouin of Belgium
- Preceded by: Fernand Van Langenhove
- Succeeded by: Constant Schuurmans

Belgian Ambassador in Moscow
- In office 1955–1959
- Monarch: Baudouin of Belgium
- Preceded by: Edouard Le Ghait
- Succeeded by: Hippolite Cools

Belgian Ambassador in Mexico City
- In office 1951–1954
- Monarch: Leopold III of Belgium

Belgian Minister Plenipotentiary and Ambassador in Valencia and Barcelona
- In office 19 May 1937 – 1939
- Monarch: Leopold III of Belgium
- Preceded by: Joseph Berryer
- Succeeded by: Charles de Romrée de Vichenet

Personal details
- Born: 22 February 1909 Menen, Belgium
- Died: 17 April 1997 (aged 88) Brussels, Belgium
- Education: Université libre de Bruxelles

Walter Marie Joseph Emile Victor Désiré Arthur Armand Louis Loridan (Menen, 22 February 1909 — Brussels, 17 April 1997) was a Belgian diplomat and academic.

== Career ==
Loridan was a commercial engineering graduate from the Université libre de Bruxelles and received his PhD in political science from the same university, before entering the Belgian foreign civil service in 1934. In the early days of his career at the Belgian Ministry of Foreign Affairs, he was an attaché at the League of Nations, then a consul in Warsaw. During the Spanish Civil War, he was chargé d'affaires in Valencia and Barcelona from 1937 to 1940. There, he would make his apartment available for the wife of Belgian Socialist politician Camille Huysmans, Marthe Huysmans, who organised a meeting with Camille's colleague Emile Vandervelde and leaders of all Spanish political parties in February 1938. Then, he became the chargé d'affaires in Mexico, where he befriended Jacques Soustelle.

After a stint at the Belgian embassy in Washington as a deputy in 1943, he was called by Minister of Foreign Affairs Paul-Henri Spaak, like Loridan a Socialist, to serve as his Secretary in the Belgian government in exile in London. As a Socialist, he would stay his Secretary after the war and was a member of Belgium's delegation to the San Francisco Conference. In 1948, he was appointed Director of Politics in the Ministry.

Loridan was sent back to Mexico to serve as Minister Plenipotentiary, then as Ambassador (1951—1955). From 1955 to 1959, he was the Belgian Ambassador to the Soviet Union in Moscow.

During a crucial time in Belgium's relation with the United Nations, Loridan was the Permanent Representative of his country to the United Nations in New York, from 1959 to 1965. Five days after the Republic of the Congo gained its independence from Belgium on 30 June 1960, a mutiny broke out which made Belgium decide to unilaterally send troops to the former Belgian Congo. During the United Nations Security Council meeting of 13 and 14 July 1960 regarding the Congo Crisis, Loridan was authorised to speak, which caused a heated debate because there was no Congolese delegation present in New York to respond.

After his time in New York, he was sent out to Bonn as the Ambassador to the Federal Republic of Germany, from 1965 to 1969, before embarking on his last diplomatic mission as Belgium's Ambassador to the United States from 1969 to 1974.

== Publications ==
- Loridan, Walter (1 September 1946). "Belgium and the United Nations". The Annals of the American Academy of Political and Social Science. 247 (1): 165–170. doi:10.1177/000271624624700133. S2CID 142994673.
