= List of permanent representatives of Belgium to the United Nations =

The Belgian permanent representative to the United Nations is the senior member of Belgium's delegation to the United Nations, based in New York.

== Permanent representatives ==
- 1945–1946: Paul-Henri Spaak
- 1946–1948: Fernand Dehousse
- ????
- 1951–1952: Fernand Dehousse
- ????
- 1955: Fernand Van Langenhove
- ????
- 1959–1965: Walter Loridan
- 1965–1969: Constant Schuurmans
- 1972–1973: Edouard Longerstaey
- 1974–1977: Patrick Nothomb
- 1978–1981: Andre Ernemann
- 1981–1988: Edmonde Dever
- ????
- 1994–1998: Alexis Reyn
- 1998–2001: André Adam
- 2001–2004: Jean de Ruyt
- 2004–2008: Johan Verbeke
- 2008–2012: Jan Grauls
- 2013–2016: Bénédicte Frankinet
- 2016–2020: Marc Pecsteen de Buytswerve
- 2020: Philippe Kridelka
- 2025-present: Sophie Jang de Smedt
