= Dominique Struye de Swielande =

Belgian diplomat

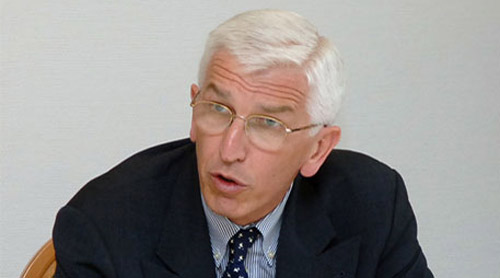
Dominique Struye de Swielande

Dominique Benoit Marie Hubert, Baron Struye de Swielande (10 July 1947 – 27 October 2015) was a Belgian diplomat, who, at his last post, was Ambassador of Belgium to the Democratic Republic of Congo.

== Biography ==
Struye was born in Ghent, in Flanders, Belgium. He holds a doctorate in law from the Catholic University of Leuven, a master's in law from University College London, and a master's in European Law from the University of Ghent.

Struye began his diplomatic career on 1 February 1974. From 1975 to 1984 he held various posts at embassies in Austria, Nigeria, Zimbabwe, and Zaire.

From 1984 to 1987, Struye was a counsellor in the cabinet of the Belgian Minister of Foreign Affairs, Leo Tindemans. From 1987 to 1990 he was the consul general and deputy permanent representative to the United Nations in Geneva. In 1990 he was the director of the European section at the Belgian Ministry of Foreign Affairs. He then moved up to become the chief of staff (1991–92) in the cabinet of the new minister of Foreign Affairs, Mark Eyskens. From 1992 to 1994 he was the diplomatic counsellor and deputy chief of staff of the Belgian prime minister, Jean-Luc Dehaene. From 1994 to 1995 he was the director general for administration at the Ministry of Foreign Affairs.

From 1995 to 1996, Struye was the head of the cabinet of the secretary of state for international cooperation, Reginald Moreels. From 1997 to 2002 he was the Belgian ambassador to Germany. From 2002 to 2006 he was the permanent representative of Belgium at NATO.

Struye became Ambassador of Belgium to the United States on December 29, 2006, replacing Frans van Daele.

In February 2009, Struye became Ambassador of Belgium to the Democratic Republic of Congo. He retired in 2012.

In 2014, Dominique Struye de Swielande was promoted to the title of baron for life by King Philippe of Belgium.

== Honours ==
- Grand officer in the Order of Leopold
- Grand officer in the Order of the Crown
- Grand officer in the Order of Leopold II
- Commander in the Order of the Cross of Terra Mariana
- Officer of the Order of Merit of the Austrian Republic
- Officer of the Order of Merit of the Italian Republic

== Offices held ==
Diplomatic posts
Preceded by ?	Belgian Ambassador to Germany; 1997–2002	Succeeded by ?
Preceded by ?	Belgian Representative to NATO; 2002–2006	Succeeded by ?
Preceded by Frans van Daele	Belgian Ambassador to the United States; 2006–2009	Succeeded by Jan Matthysen
Preceded by Johan Swinnen	Belgian Ambassador to DR Congo; 2009–2002	Succeeded by ?
