= Jean-Marie Piret =

Belgian politician (1930–2020)

- Born: 27 March 1930; Tournai, Belgium
- Died: 2 November 2020 (aged 90); Woluwe-Saint-Lambert, Belgium
- Occupations: civil servant, royal secretary

Jean-Marie Piret (Tournai 27 March 1930 – Woluwe-Saint-Lambert 7 November 2020) was Attorney General of the Supreme Court of Appeal and Principal Private Secretary to the King of the Belgians.

== Education ==
Jean-Marie Piret was a laureate of Belgium's interdiocesan history competition in 1947, the year he completed his Greco-Latin humanities at the Institut Saint-Boniface in Ixelles, with the gold medal. He obtained a doctorate in law from the Catholic University of Louvain on 19 July 1952, with great distinction.

== Career ==
Registered with the Brussels Bar Association in 1955, he joined the Brussels public prosecutor's office in 1957 as a substitute. He became the first substitute in June 1971, and the King's prosecutor at the end of September 1983, after being appointed head of the Criminal Problems Division at the General Secretariat of the Council of Europe in Strasbourg from 1 August 1972. His Majesty Baudouin I of Belgium made him his chief of staff from 1977 to 1983, a position he left to become advocate general at the Court of Cassation in February 1983. Holder of numerous high distinctions and Belgian and foreign honorifics, he became the head of the public prosecutor's office at the Court of Cassation in 1998, when the King appointed him Attorney General. He acceded to emeritus in March 2000.

== See also ==
- Michel Didisheim
- André Molitor
- Jacques van Ypersele de Strihou
- Frans van Daele

== Sources ==
- In memoriam Jean-Marie Piret
