= Houssiau =

Houssiau is a Belgian surname. Notable people with the surname include:

- Albert Houssiau (1924–2026), Belgian prelate
- Vincent Houssiau (born 1962), Belgian diplomat
