= André Adam (diplomat) =

Belgian-French diplomat

Permanent Representative of Belgium to the United Nations
- In office 8 September 1998 – April 2001
- Monarch: Albert II
- Preceded by: Alexis Reyn
- Succeeded by: Jean de Ruyt

Belgian Ambassador to the United States
- In office 3 October 1994 – September 1998
- Monarch: Albert II
- Preceded by: Juan Cassiers
- Succeeded by: Alexis Reyn

Belgian Ambassador to Zaire
- In office 27 April 1990 – 18 August 1991
- Monarch: Baudouin
- Preceded by: André Onkelinx
- Succeeded by: Jean Coene

Belgian Ambassador to Algeria
- In office 1986–1990
- Monarch: Baudouin
- Preceded by: Maurice Vaisiere
- Succeeded by: Dirk Lettens

Personal details
- Born: 10 September 1936 Etterbeek, Brussels, Belgium
- Died: 22 March 2016 (aged 79) Zaventem, Flemish Brabant, Belgium
- Citizenship: Belgium; France (from 2006)
- Spouse: Danielle David
- Education: Free University of Brussels

André Adam (10 September 1936 – 22 March 2016) was a Belgian-French diplomat. His postings during his lengthy diplomatic career included Consul General of Belgium in Los Angeles (1982–1986), Ambassador to Algeria (1986–1990), Ambassador to Zaire (1990–1991), Ambassador to the United States (1994–1998), and Permanent Representative to the United Nations (1998–2001). He was killed in the double suicide bombing at Brussels Airport on 22 March 2016.

== Early life and education ==
Adam was born in Etterbeek, Brussels, on 10 September 1936. He attended the Free University of Brussels receiving degrees in political and diplomatic science and public administration.

== Diplomatic career ==
After a short stint as a research assistant at the Free University of Brussels, Adam entered the foreign service in 1962 and was posted in Havana, where he met his wife, Danielle David, after which he served in Paris, Kinshasa, and London. In 1979, he became chief of staff to Henri Simonet, then the Belgian foreign minister. He later served as the Belgian Consul General in Los Angeles from 1982 till 1986, Belgium's Ambassador to Algeria (1986 - 1990) and Zaire (1990 - 1991).

Adam's time in Zaire was marked by tense bilateral relations between Belgium and Zaire. On 24 April 1990, Zaire's President Mobutu Sese Seko announced the end of the country's one-party system and promised a series of measures to democratise Zaire. On the night of 11—12 May, however, student protests at the Lubumbashi campus of the National University of Zaire were met with bloody repression, resulting in many casualties as established by the United Nations Special Rapporteur on Summary or Arbitrary Executions of the Commission on Human Rights Amos Wako. Adam visited the Lubumbashi premises. The bloody repression had profound repercussion to Belgo-Zairean relations, which were effectively put on hold until Mobutu's ousting from power by Laurent-Désiré Kabila. Adam further had a meeting with Archbishop Laurent Monsengwo Pasinya regarding Mobutu in March 1991 which resulted in the writing of an "explosive note" about the situation by the ambassador. Adam left Zaire in August 1991, right before the week-long looting spree of the national army in September 1991 Kinshasa.

Afterwards, Adam was the Ambassador to the United States from 1994 till 1998. He presented his credentials to United Nations Secretary General Kofi Annan in 1998, holding office as Permanent Representative to the United Nations in New York.

Adam also served as the Director General of Political Affairs of the Ministry of Foreign Affairs from 1991 until 1994.

== Later life and death ==
Adam retired from the diplomatic service in 2001. After his retirement, he and his wife moved to Larressingle, southwestern France, where they lived until his death. Adam became a French citizen in 2006.

Adam was killed in the double suicide bombing in the departure hall of Brussels Airport in Zaventem on the morning of 22 March 2016, as he and his wife waited for their daughter, who was due to fly with them to the United States.

== Offices held ==
Diplomatic posts
Preceded by Maurice Vaisiere	Belgian Ambassador to Algeria; 1986–1990	Succeeded by Dirk Lettens
Preceded by André Onkelinx	Belgian Ambassador to Zaire; 1990–1991	Succeeded by Jean Coene
Preceded by Juan Cassiers	Belgian Ambassador to the United States; 1994–1998	Succeeded by Alexis Reyn
Preceded by Andre Ernemann	Belgian Permanent Representative to the United Nations; 1998–2001	Succeeded by Jean de Ruyt
