= Margaret Ekua Prah =

Ghanaian diplomat

Amb. Margaret Ekua Prah

Ghana High Commissioner to Zambia
- Incumbent
- Assumed office July 2017
- President: Nana Akuffo-Addo
- Preceded by: Morgan Adokwei Brown

Personal details
- Born: Ghana
- Party: New Patriotic Party

Margaret Ekua Prah is a Ghanaian diplomat and a member of the New Patriotic Party of Ghana. She is currently Ghana's ambassador to Zambia.

== Ambassadorial appointment ==
In July 2017, President Nana Akuffo-Addo named Margaret Prah as Ghana's ambassador to Zambia. She was among twenty two other distinguished Ghanaians who were named to head various diplomatic Ghanaian mission in the world.
