= Belgium–United States relations =

- Belgium: United States

Diplomatic mission
- Belgian Embassy, Washington, D.C.: United States Embassy, Brussels

Envoy
- Ambassador of Belgium to the United States Jean-Arthur Régibeau: Ambassador of the United States to Belgium Bill White

The United States and Belgium maintain a friendly bilateral relationship. Continuing to celebrate cooperative U.S. and Belgian relations, 2007 marked the 175th anniversary of the nations' relationship.

According to the 2021 U.S. Global Leadership Report, 61% of Belgians approve of U.S. leadership, with 26% disapproving and 13% uncertain.

== History ==
=== Before World War I ===
Prior to 1830, Belgium was part of the United Kingdom of the Netherlands, heir of the Dutch Republic, which colonized much of the northeastern coast of North America during the 17th Century (see New Netherland, New Netherland settlements). As part of this (ultimately failed) colonial project, many people from the Southern Netherlands - especially Walloons - settled in what would become the United States during the 1600s.

During the American Revolutionary War many of the descendants of settlers from the southern Low Countries in North America fought in the Continental Army.

In 1830, Belgium declared its independence from the United Kingdom of the Netherlands. During the ensuing Belgian Revolution, France helped Belgium gain its independence. The United States recognized Belgium as an independent country on January 6, 1832. An American legation headed by Hugh S. Legaré arrived in Brussels that same year. The U.S., Britain and other major countries demanded Belgium pay cash indemnities from Belgium for property damages incurred during its Revolution of 1830. American merchants lost $151,000. Belgium stalled for years and finally paid in 1842 after increasing threats from Washington about penalizing trade.

Most of the routine diplomacy, and assistance in trade matters, was handled by the chargé d'affaires in Belgium: Hugh S. Legaré, 1832–36; Virgil Maxcy, 1837–42; Henry Washington Hilliard, 1842–44; and Thomas Green Clemson, 1844-51.

Many Belgians immigrated to the United States throughout the 19th Century. Today, there are over 350,000 United States residents who identify as Belgian American. Many of these Belgian immigrants settled in Midwestern states, such as Wisconsin and Michigan.

In 1884, Leopold II, the King of the Belgians, struck a deal with the major European powers present at the Berlin Conference, held between the states that would later take part in the Scramble for Africa. Leopold convinced those colonial powers present at the Conference to allow him to personally take control of an area of land known as the Congo Free State (comprising the territory of the modern-day country of the Democratic Republic of the Congo). Under Leopold's private control, widespread atrocities were committed against the native Africans living in the Congo Free State. These atrocities were highly publicized, with residents of the United States being among Leopold II's most vocal critics. Among the critics were famous Americans such as Booker T. Washington, W.E.B. Du Bois, and Mark Twain (who attacked Leopold directly in an inflammatory pamphlet entitled King Leopold's Soliloquy). In 1908, forced to respond to this international outcry, the Belgian government rescinded Leopold's private rule over the Congo Free State and annexed the territory, making the Congo Free State into the Belgian Congo, a full-fledged colony of Belgium.

U.S. and Belgian soldiers fought together during the Siege of the International Legations in 1900, part of the larger Boxer Rebellion in China (1899-1901).

=== World War I (1914–1918) ===
When Germany invaded Belgium in August 1914, the mining engineer and future U.S. President Herbert Hoover set up aid organizations: the Committee for Relief in Belgium (CRB) and the National Committee for Help and Food. By the end of the war, these organizations had accumulated a net surplus of $30 million in funds, which was used to improve Belgium's educational system. Brand Whitlock was a top aide to Hoover.

The U.S. legation in Brussels was elevated to the status of an embassy on October 3, 1919.

=== World War II (1939–1945) ===
John Cudahy, wealthy scion of a Wisconsin meatpacking enterprise, in 1940 became Franklin Roosevelt's ambassador to Belgium. He developed a close personal friendship with King Leopold III. Germany forced his recall. He denounced Britain, France and the U.S. for a failure to plan an adequate defense. He became an embarrassment to Washington, which was officially neutral.

U.S. troops helped to liberate Belgium from German occupation along with British troops, Canadian troops, and members of the Belgian Resistance. According to Pieter Lagrou, American policy after the Nazis were driven out focused on creating political stability and helping Allied military operations. Washington ignored the fierce ideological debates in Belgium, focusing on whether the King was wise or traitorous in his dealings with the Nazis. Washington and London were neutral on the Royal question, but US Ambassador Charles Sawyer mistrusted the king and the Catholic parties. He saw significant dangers to democracy from those elements and therefore supported the left-wing coalition government headed by the socialists.

=== Cold War (1947–1991) ===
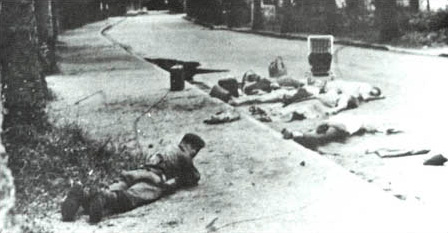
Operation Dragon Rouge

Belgium received aid from the United States through the Marshall Plan, aimed at reconstructing the post-war European economy although Belgian economic recovery predated the Marshall Plan. Both Belgium and the US were among the founding members of NATO, a North Atlantic collective defence alliance. Belgium also participated in the US-led UN mission to repel the North Korean invasion of South Korea during the Korean War (see Belgian United Nations Command).

According to Frank Gerits, Washington used the diplomats at the embassy and especially the facilities of the United States Information Service (USIS) in the 1950s to support its Cold War strategy. USIS propaganda influenced Belgian public opinion to favor the United States generally, support NATO, support the Korean war effort, and promote the European Defense Community (EDC).

In 1960, the Belgian Congo gained independence from Belgium as the Republic of the Congo (today known as the Democratic Republic of the Congo). As the newly independent country fell into civil war during the Congo Crisis, Belgium and the United States cooperated to foil Soviet efforts to turn the Congo into a communist country. Both the Belgian and U.S. militaries intervened to rescue captives during Operation Dragon Rouge. Belgium and the United States were ultimately successful in helping the oppressive, anti-communist regime of Joseph-Désiré Mobutu come to power.

=== Post-Cold War (1992–present) ===
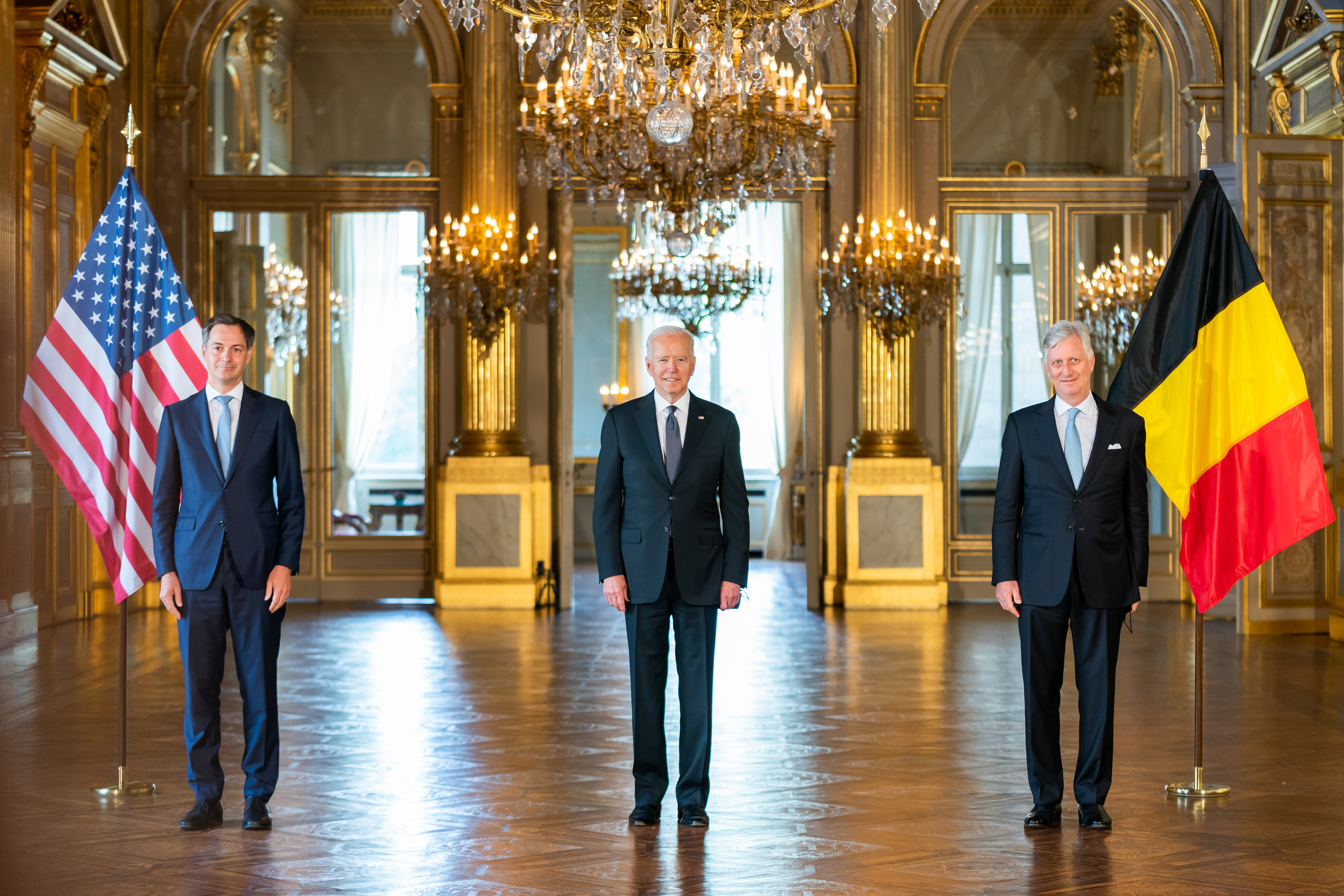
U.S President Joe Biden meets with King Phillipe of Belgium and the Prime Minister of Belgium Alexander De Croo in Brussels in June 2021.

The U.S. appreciates Belgian activism in international affairs, including its participation in the International Security Assistance Force in Afghanistan, its reconstruction and development assistance to Iraq, its peacekeeping missions in the Balkans and Lebanon, its frequent provision of airlift in international crises, and its hosting of 2005 and 2007 transatlantic dialogues between European foreign ministers and the Secretary of State. During the January 17, 2006, visit by Prime Minister Verhofstadt, President Bush thanked him for his "leadership" in helping "the people of the Congo realize their full potential."

As an outward-looking nation, Belgium works closely with the United States bilaterally and in international and regional organizations to encourage economic and political cooperation and assistance to developing countries. Belgium has welcomed hundreds of U.S. firms to its territory, many of which have their European headquarters there.

== Resident diplomatic missions ==
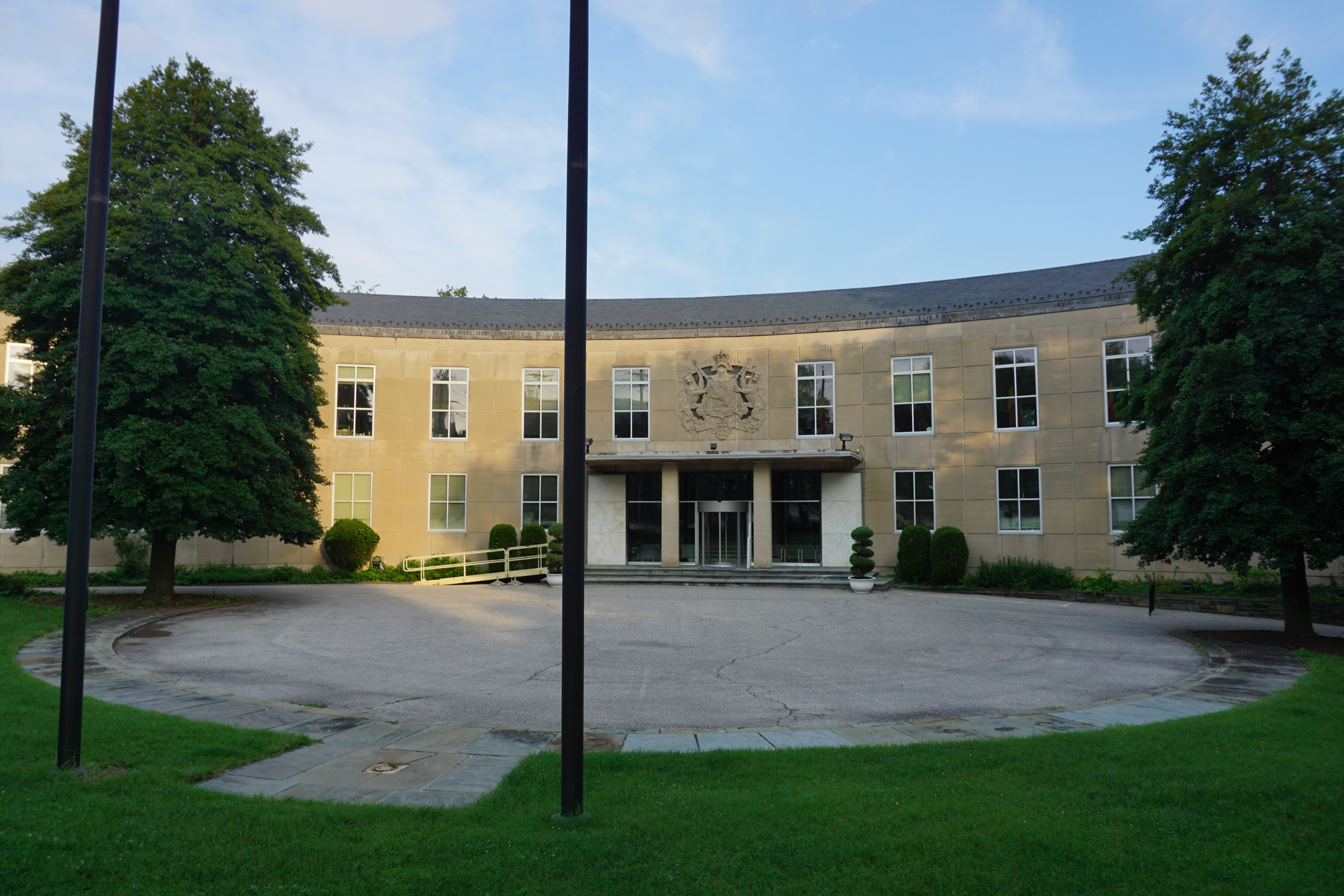
Former embassy building of Belgium in Washington D.C.

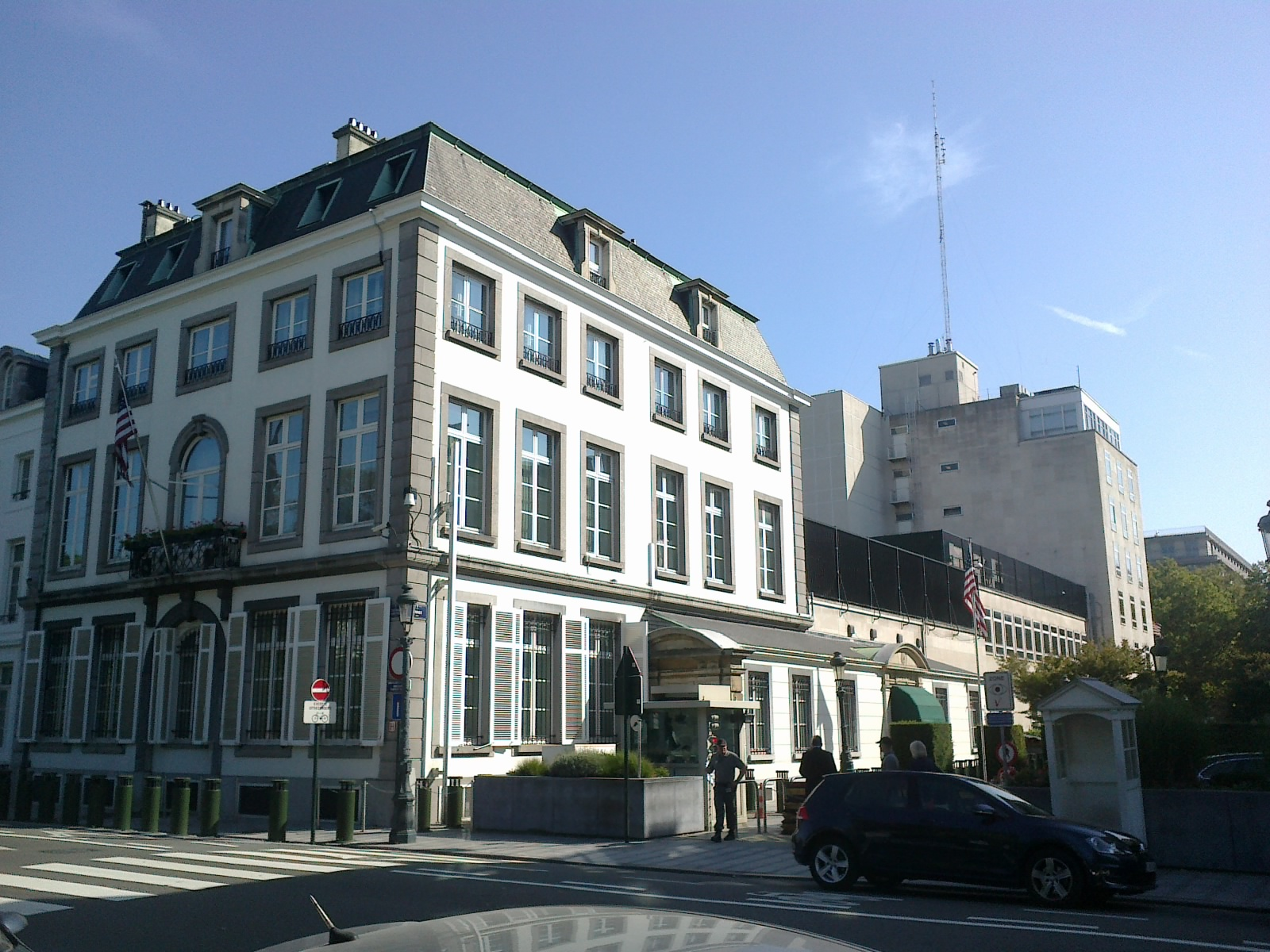
Embassy of the United States in Brussels

The Embassy of Belgium in Washington, D.C. is the diplomatic mission of the Kingdom of Belgium to the United States. The chancery is located at 1430 K Street, Northwest, Washington, D.C. The previous location, in use by the Kingdom of Belgium since its construction in 1956, at 3330 Garfield St. NW, was sold to Vietnam in 2019.

Belgium also operates consulates-general in Atlanta, Los Angeles and New York City. In addition, several communities and regions of Belgium also have diplomatic representations in the United States. The Belgian ambassador to the United States is Jean-Arthur Régibeau.

The United States operates an embassy in Brussels while maintaining separate missions to the European Union and to NATO.

== See also ==
- Foreign relations of Belgium
- Foreign relations of the United States
- United States-EU relations
- NATO-EU relations
- Belgian Americans
