= Embassy of the United States, Brussels =

Diplomatic mission of the United States in Brussels, Belgium

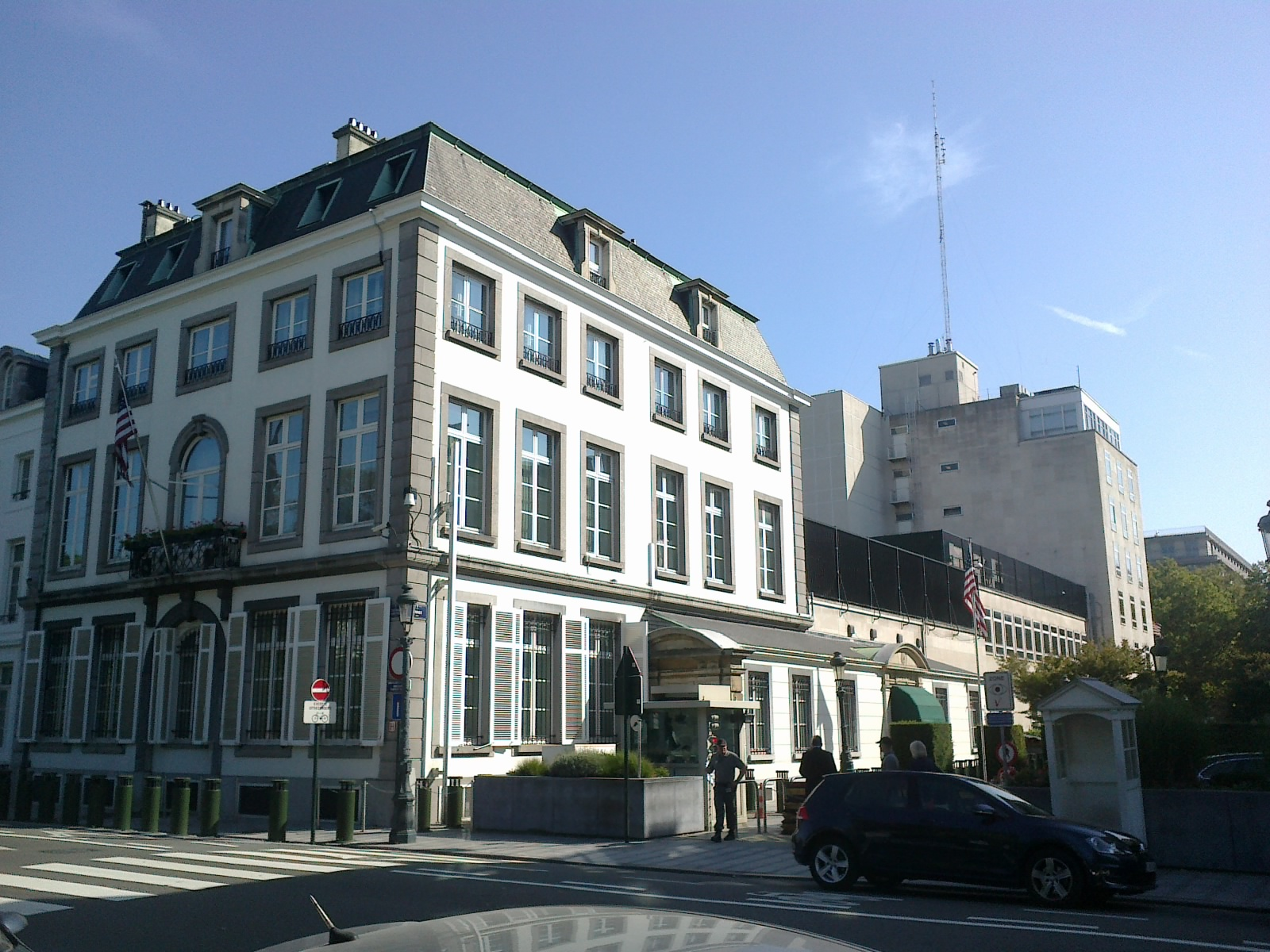
- Location: 1000 City of Brussels, Brussels-Capital Region, Belgium
- Address: Boulevard du Régent / Regentlaan 27/B
- Coordinates: 50°50′40″N 4°22′3″E
- Opened: 1919
- Relocated: Announced in 2022
- Closed: 1940–1944
- Jurisdiction: Belgium
- Website: be.usembassy.gov

The Embassy of the United States in Brussels is the chief diplomatic mission of the United States in Belgium. The complex of the embassy currently consists of three buildings situated around the Rue Ducale/Hertogsstraat, the Rue Zinner/Zinnerstraat and the Boulevard du Régent/Regentlaan, where the headquarters is (at no. 27).

== History ==
The embassy initially opened in 1919. It was closed in 1940 after the German invasion of Belgium, and it reopened in 1944.

In 2022, the embassy announced plans to move a new building on the Cours Saint-Michel/Sint Michielswarande site in Etterbeek.

== Security perimeter and controversy ==
Since 2001, following the September 11 attacks, unprecedented security measures have been in force around the embassy. A perimeter has been set up within which the use of the public road is denied to passers-by. This was intended as a temporary measure that would end when the Belgian Coordination Unit for Threat Analysis (OCAD/OCAM) lowered the terror alert level. However, durable constructions appeared on the site: barriers, guardhouses, and in 2008, even a metal fence behind which part of the Boulevard du Régent/Regentlaan disappeared. In order not to completely block the passage for pedestrians and cyclists, a narrow path was constructed. However, the Rue Zinner/Zinnerstraat was privatized in its entirety.

Not only is the size of the perimeter controversial, but also the way in which it is enforced. Where in the beginning the Belgian police mainly carried out the checks, private security services gradually gained greater powers. Despite the authorization by the Minister of the Interior, this was done illegally. Only in 2004 did it become legally possible for private guards to carry out checks on public roads, provided that this is elaborated in special police regulations. Such regulations were only introduced at the end of 2011. The mayor did not deny that an unlawful situation was being regularized.

Despite this, there have been cases where the security officers have called people outside the perimeter to order, forbidden them from taking pictures and even threatened to confiscate their cameras.

== See also ==
- Embassy of Belgium, Washington, D.C.
- List of ambassadors of the United States to Belgium
- Belgium–United States relations
- United States Mission to the European Union
- United States Mission to NATO
