= List of ambassadors of Belgium to the United States =

The following list of Ambassadors of Belgium to the United States, excluding interim chargés d'affaires, who head the Embassy of Belgium, Washington, D.C.

== History ==
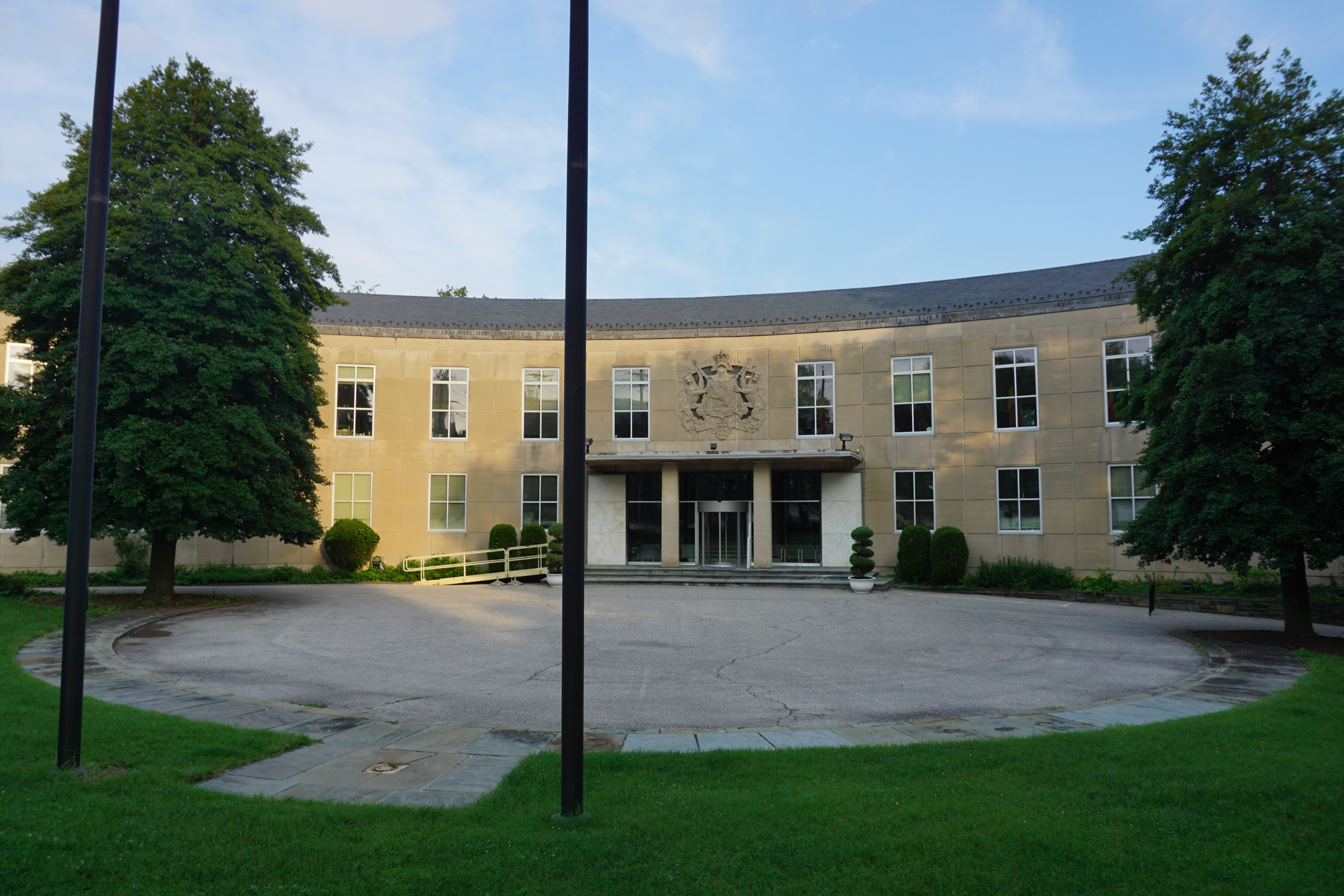
Former embassy building of Belgium in Washington D.C.

The Embassy of Belgium in Washington, D.C. is the diplomatic mission of the Kingdom of Belgium to the United States. The chancery is located at 1430 K Street, Northwest, Washington, D.C. The previous location, in use by the Kingdom of Belgium since its construction in 1956, at 3330 Garfield St. NW, was sold to Vietnam in 2019.

Belgium also operates consulates-general in Atlanta, Los Angeles and New York City. In addition, several communities and regions of Belgium also have diplomatic representations in the United States.

== Heads of Mission ==
=== Envoys Extraordinary and Ministers Plenipotentiary ===
- 1848: Colonel Beaulieu.
- 1864: Eduard Blondeel
- 1882-1885: Théodore de Bounder de Melsbrœck
- 1897–1899: Count G. de Lichtervelde
- 1889–1901: Alfred Le Ghait
- 1901–1909: Baron Moncheur
- 1909–1911: Count Conrad de Buisseret
- 1911–1917: Emmanuel Havenith
- 1917–1919: Emile de Cartier de Marchienne

=== Ambassadors Extraordinary and Plenipotentiary ===
- 1920–1927: Baron Emile de Cartier de Marchienne
- 1927–1931: Prince Albert de Ligne
- 1931–1934: Paul May
- 1935–1945: Count Robert van der Straten Ponthoz
- 1945–1959: Baron Robert Silvercruys
- 1959–1969: Louis Scheyven
- 1969–1974: Walter Loridan
- 1974–1979: Willy Van Cauwenberg
- 1979–1985: Raoul Schoumaker
- 1986–1991: Herman Dehennin
- 1991–1994: Juan Gassiers
- 1994–1998: André Adam
- 1998–2002: Alexis Reyn
- 2002–2006: Frans van Daele
- 2007–2009: Dominique Struye de Swielande
- 2009–2014: Jan Matthysen
- 2014–2016: Johan Verbeke
- 2016–2020: Dirk Wouters
- 2020–2025: Jean-Arthur Régibeau
- 2025–present: Frederic Bernard
