= Vincent Houssiau =

Belgian diplomat

- Born: 1 September 1962 (age 63); Belgium
- Occupations: civil servant, royal secretary

Vincent Houssiau (1 September 1962) is a Belgian diplomat and Principal Private Secretary to the King of the Belgians.

== Early life ==
Houssiau comes from a large family. He has four sisters and two brothers. His father was a doctor. He married in 1998.

== Career ==
Vincent Houssiau is a philosopher by training and became a diplomat. He was active with a post in Athens and at the Belgian Permanent Representation to the European Union. He worked in the cabinets of Prime Ministers Herman Van Rompuy and Yves Leterme (CD&V) and in 2011 became Head of Cabinet of Minister of Foreign Affairs Steven Vanackere (CD&V). He succeeded Vanackere as Deputy Chief of Cabinet of Finance. When Koen Geens succeeded Vanackere in the Di Rupo Government and Chief of Staff Eric Kirsch left for the OECD, he became Chief of Cabinet of Finance. In 2014, in the Michel I Government, Geens was given the Justice Department, and he re-elected Houssiau as head of his political cabinet. Since the summer of 2017, he has been chief of staff to King Philippe, succeeding Frans van Daele. He is a member of the board of directors of the King Baudouin Foundation.

== See also ==
- Jacques van Ypersele de Strihou

== Sources ==
- New chief of staff for King Filip
- Staff of the household of His Majesty King Philippe
