= Dirk Wouters =

Belgian diplomat

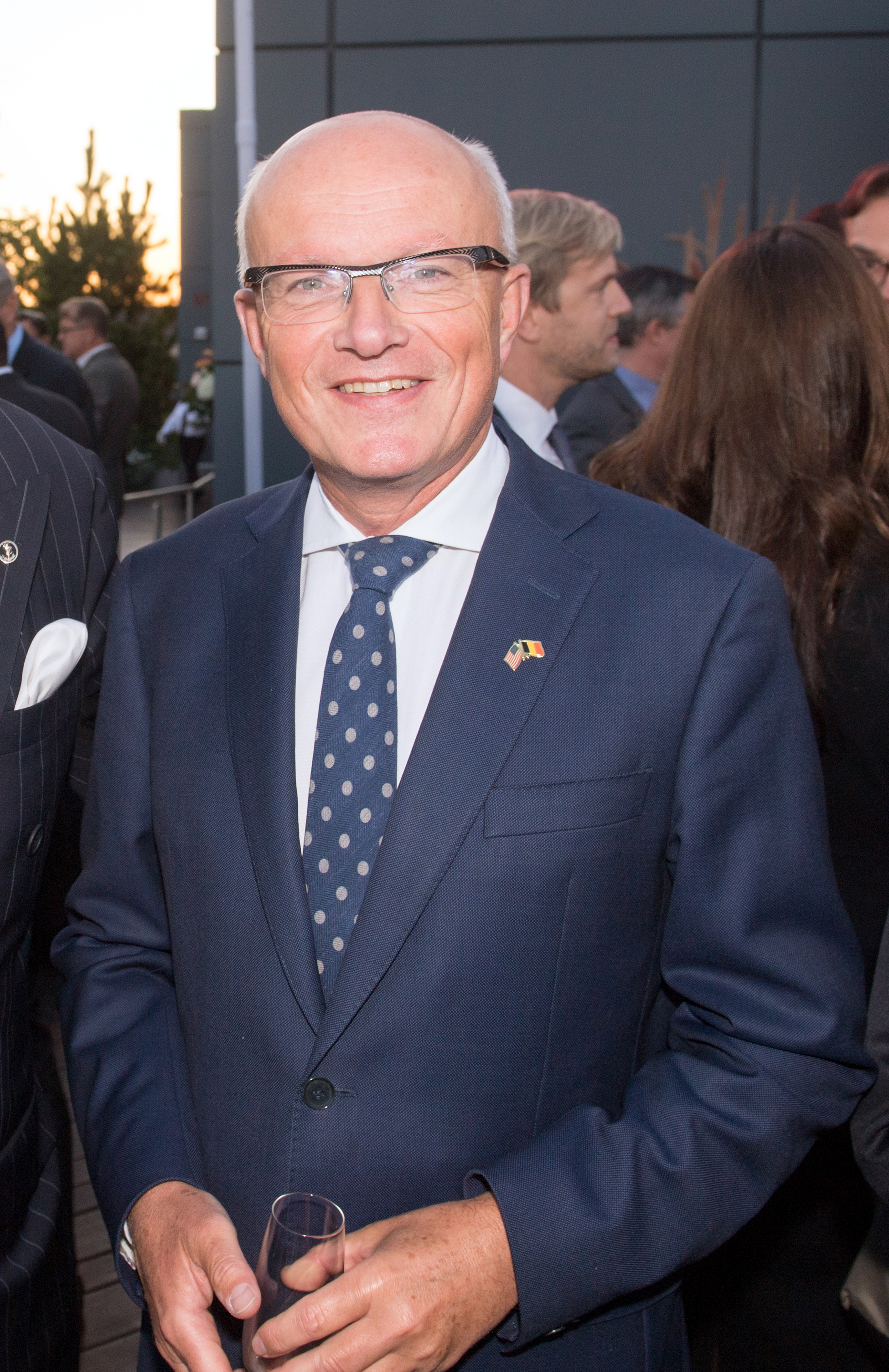

Ambassador of Belgium to the United States
- In office September 2016 – September 2020
- Prime Minister: Charles Michel; Sophie Wilmès
- Preceded by: Johan C. Verbeke
- Succeeded by: Jean-Arthur Régibeau

Personal details
- Born: 1955 (age 70–71)
- Children: 1
- Education: University of Antwerp; University of Leuven; London School of Economics

Dirk Wouters (born 1955) was Belgium's ambassador to the United States.

== Education ==
Wouters earned a B.A. degree in law and economics at the University of Antwerp in 1975, a Master of Laws at the University of Leuven in 1978 and an M.S. at the London School of Economics in 1979.

== Diplomatic career ==
Wouters started his diplomatic career in the Belgian Federal Public Service Foreign Affairs in 1980, where he worked in the Consular and Disarmament Division and joined the Belgian delegation to the European Union in 1986. In 1995, he moved to the United States to work on political, military, and development issues as deputy permanent representative to the United Nations. He also helped establish the International Criminal Court. From 2001 to 2003, Wouters served as coordinator of the Belgian Presidency and head of the Department for European Coordination and Integration. He was appointed Permanent representative to the EU Political and Security Committee in 2003 and in 2009 became diplomatic adviser to the prime minister. Wouters became chief of staff to the foreign minister and dealt mainly with Afghanistan and Libya policy.

In 2011, Wouters was appointed Belgium's Permanent representative to the EU and stayed in that position until he moved to Washington in 2016. From 2016 to 2020, Wouters was Belgium's ambassador to the United States of America.

== Personal life ==
Wouters is married with one child and 3 grandchildren.
