= Morgan Adokwei Brown =

Ghanaian lawyer and diplomat (b. 1959)

Amb. Morgan Adokwei Brown

Ghana High Commissioner to Zambia
- In office 2016–2017
- President: John Mahama
- Preceded by: Elizabeth Afua Benneh
- Succeeded by: Margaret Ekua Prah

Ghana Ambassador to Belgium
- In office 2012–2016
- President: John Mahama
- Preceded by: Yaw Kunadu-Yiadom
- Succeeded by: Novisi Aku Abaidoo

Personal details
- Born: 29 May 1959 (age 67) Accra, Ghana
- Education: Accra Academy; University of Ghana; Ghana Institute of Management and Public Administration (GIMPA); University of Nairobi; University of London

Morgan Adokwei Brown (born 29 May 1959) is a lawyer and a Ghanaian diplomat. He was Ghana's Ambassador to the Kingdom of Belgium, the Grand Duchy of Luxembourg, and Head of Mission to the European Union from 2012 to 2016, and has also been Ghana's High Commissioner to Zambia from 2016 to 2017.

== Early years and education ==
Morgan was born on 29 May 1959 in Accra, Ghana. He had his secondary education at the Accra Academy from 1971 to 1978 he proceeded to the University of Ghana, Legon where he gained his Bachelor of laws degree from 1979 to 1982 and later to the Ghana School of Law for a barrister-at-law post graduate degree from 1982 to 1984. He pursued a course in international relations at the Academy of Social Sciences in Sofia, Bulgaria in 1986 and continued to the Ghana Institute of Management and Public Administration (GIMPA) from 1986 to 1988. He also studied diplomacy and international relations at the University of Nairobi, Kenya from 1989 to 1990 and legislative drafting at the University of London in 2007.

== Career ==
His career begun as a legal advisor to the Tema district council now the Tema Metropolitan Assembly as a national service personnel from 1985 to 1986. He was assistant legal and consular director for the Ministry for Foreign Affairs from 1986 to 1990. He later became assistant Europe bureau director at the Ministry for Foreign Affairs. He served as Counsellor of the Head of Chancery for the Ghana Permanent Mission to the United Nations, New York City, with responsibility for the third, fifth and sixth Committees of the United Nations General Assembly from 1992 to 1996 then acting director for the legal and consular bureau at the Ministry for Foreign Affairs from 1996 to 1998. He was minister counsellor for the head of chancery for the Ghana embassy at Monrovia, Liberia from 1998 to 2002. He became acting director for the policy planning and research bureau at the Ministry for Foreign Affairs later in 2002. From 2002 to 2003 he was deputy director for passports at the ministry. He was deputy director for the African Union bureau at the ministry from 2003 to 2004. From 2004 to 2008, he was minister for the head of chancery at the High Commission of Ghana, London. He became the supervising director for policy, planning research and monitoring department for the Ministry for Foreign Affairs from 2008 to 2009. Then director for administration at the ministry from 2009 to 2010. From 2010 to 2013 he was deputy head of mission for the Ghana embassy at Copenhagen, Denmark. In 2013 he was appointed Ghana's ambassador to Belgium with concurrent accreditation to Luxembourg and the European Union. He served in this capacity until 2016 when he was appointed Ghana's high commissioner to Zambia. He served in this position until 2017.

== Personal life ==
He is married with three children. His hobbies include lawn tennis and listening to music.
