= André Molitor =

- Born: 4 August 1911; Kermanshah, Qajar Persia (now Iran)
- Died: 4 June 2005 (aged 93–94); Brussels, Belgium
- Occupations: politician, civil servant

André Molitor (4 August 1911 – 4 June 2005) was a former Belgian senior civil servant of the Belgian State and former principal private secretary of King Baudouin I of Belgium from 1961 until 1977 (17 years). André Molitor was also a professor of public administration at the Université catholique de Louvain.

== Biography ==
Molitor was born in Kermanshah, Qajar Persia, the son of a Belgian civil servant, established in Iran since 1901, on a mission of modernization of the Iranian customs. In 1935, he obtained the title of Doctor in Law, and since 1937, pursued a career in the Belgian public office. He was also the principal private secretary of the Minister Pierre Harmel and was the craftsman of the school pact of 1958, which ended a period of political dissension over the funding of secondary education. Since the end of World War II, André Molitor directed La Revue Nouvelle, (E : New Review), a Christian Democrat publication in Belgium. He directed the review Administration publique (E: Public administration). At his retirement in 1977, André Molitor took up the presidency of the King Baudouin Foundation, until 1986.

== Bibliography ==
- André Molitor, La Fonction Royale en Belgique, CRISP, 1979
- André Molitor, Souvenirs: un témoin engagé dans la Belgique du 20e siècle, Editions Duculot, 1984

== See also ==
- Jean-Marie Piret
- Jacques van Ypersele de Strihou

== Sources ==
- Francis Delpérée, En Mémoire d'André Molitor, Revue internationale des Sciences administratives - RISA, Volume 71 numéro 3 Septembre 2005
- André Molitor (French)
