= Marcel Rijmenans =

Marcel Rijmenans was a Belgian ambassador. He was born in Antwerp June 16, 1922 and died in Brussels March 22, 2012.

He held a degree in commercial and consular sciences, Antwerp. He married in 1947 and had one son, Ambassador Claude Rijmenans. He was Grand Officer of the Order of the Crown and of many other Belgian and foreign honorary distinctions.

== Professional career ==
He started his professional career at the Belgian Ministry of Public Works in February 1945. In July 1946, Rijmenans began his traineeship in the Belgian Ministry of Foreign Service.

During a career spanning more than four decades, Rijmenans was posted in:

- Rome Quirinale (1947–1949)
- MFA Brussels (1950–1952)
- Santiago de Chile (1952–1955)
- San Francisco, California: Consul General (1959–1961)
- Bonn (FRG): Minister-Counsellor (1961–1964)
- Havana: Ambassador (1964–1966)
- Belgrade: Ambassador (1966–1971)
- Ottawa: Ambassador (1971–1975)
- MFA Brussels: Foreign Service Inspector General (1976–1977)
- Rome Quirinale: Ambassador (1978–1983)

His last mission in the Belgian diplomacy led him to Vienna, where he headed, from 1984 to 1987, the Belgian delegation to the MBFR (Mutual and Balanced Force Reductions) negotiations.

Rijmenans retired from the Belgian diplomatic service in August 1987, having been promoted in 1974 to the First Class, the Belgian equivalent of full Ambassadorial rank.
