= List of ambassadors to Belgium =

The following is the list of ambassadors to Belgium. Note that some diplomats are accredited by, or to, more than one country.

== Current ambassadors to Brussels ==
Sending country	Ambassador	Presentation of the credentials (As of 27 June 2026)	Location of resident (City)	Embassy website
Afghanistan	Nazifullah Salarzai	12 September 2019	Brussels	
Albania	Albana Dautllari	24 September 2025	Brussels	
Algeria	Mohamed El Amine Bencherif	25 October 2023	Brussels	
Andorra	Vicenç Mateu Zamora	11 September 2025	Brussels	
Angola	Edgar Augusto Brandão Gaspar Martins	11 September 2025	Brussels	
Argentina	Fernando Adolfo Iglesias	6 May 2026	Brussels	
Armenia	Tigran Balayan	21 June 2024	Brussels	
Australia	Angus John Campbell	20 May 2025	Brussels	
Austria	Jürgen Meindl	28 October 2015	Brussels	
Azerbaijan	Vagif Sadigov	26 August 2021	Brussels	
Bahamas	Cheryl Bazard	13 February 2024	Brussels	
Bahrain	Mohamed Ali Bahzad	6 May 2025	Brussels	
Bangladesh	Khandker Masudul Alam	11 September 2025	Brussels	
Barbados	Nicolla Simone Rudder	8 July 2024	Brussels	
Belarus	Vacant (Chargé d'affaires a.i.)	—	Brussels	
Belize	Gianni Avila	28 July 2023	Brussels	
Benin	Agniola Ahouanmenou	6 May 2026	Brussels	
Bhutan	Tshoki Choden	13 September 2023	Brussels	
Bolivia	Paula Alejandra Gutiérrez Burgoa (Chargé d'affaires a.i.)	20 October 2025	Brussels	
Bosnia and Herzegovina	Erol Avdović	25 July 2023	Brussels	
Botswana	Zein Kebonang	26 May 2026	Brussels	
Brazil	Silvio José Albuquerque e Silva	28 May 2025	Brussels	
Brunei	Abu Sufian Ali	3 June 2026	Brussels	
Bulgaria	Plamen Bonchev	13 February 2024	Brussels	
Burkina Faso	Régis Kevin Bakyono	11 September 2025	Brussels	
Burundi	Thérence Ntahiraja	17 November 2021	Brussels	
Cambodia	Luy David	13 February 2024	Brussels	
Cameroon	Daniel Evina Abe'e	1 October 2008	Brussels	
Canada	Nicholas Brousseau		Brussels	
Cape Verde	Edna Marta	24 September 2025	Brussels	
Central African Republic	Daniel Emery Dede	3 February 2015	Brussels	
Chad	Mariam Ali Moussa	12 June 2026	Brussels	
Chile	Gloria Patricia de Jesús Navarrete Pinto	21 September 2022	Brussels	
China	Fei Shengchao	5 July 2024	Brussels	
Colombia	Daniel Ernesto Prado Albarracín	26 November 2024	Brussels	
Comoros	Mohamed Chatur Badaoui	27 April 2022	Brussels	
Congo, Democratic Republic of the	Christian Ndongala Nkuku	22 October 2021	Brussels	
Congo, Republic of the	Léon Raphaël Mokoko		Brussels	
Costa Rica	Eliana Villalobos Cárdenas		Brussels	
Ivory Coast	Vacant (Amenan Mathilde Kra, Chargé d'affaires a.i.)		Brussels	
Croatia	Joško Paro	1 September 2018	Brussels	
Cuba	Juan Antonio Fernandez Palacios		Brussels	
Cyprus	Spyros Attas	18 November 2024	Brussels	
Czech Republic	Jakub Skalník	7 November 2023	Brussels	
Denmark	Susanne Shine	3 October 2024	Brussels	
Djibouti	Aden Mohamed Dileita	14 July 2022	Brussels	
Dominica	Vacant (Simon Desmond Darius, Chargé d'affaires a.i.)	—	Brussels	
Dominican Republic	Joan Margarita Cedano García de Madera	11 September 2025	Brussels	
Ecuador	Xavier Aliaga Sancho	28 March 2024	Brussels	
Egypt	Ahmed Abu Zeid	20 May 2025	Brussels	
El Salvador	Javier Helamán Reyes Menjívar	7 February 2024	Brussels	
Equatorial Guinea	Miguel Oyono Ndong Mifumu	20 May 2025	Brussels	
Eritrea	Negassi Kassa Tekle	10 October 2014	Brussels	
Estonia	Helen Kaljuläte	11 September 2025	Brussels	
Ethiopia	Eshete Tilahun	28 February 2025	Brussels	
Fiji	Vacant		Brussels	
Finland	Timo Jalmari Ranta	12 November 2015	Brussels	
France	Claude-France Arnould	12 November 2015	Brussels	
Gabon	Eudes Régis Immongault Tatangani		Brussels	
Gambia	Pa Musa Jobarteh		Brussels	
Georgia	Vakhtang Makharoblishvili		Brussels	
Germany	Rüdiger Lüdeking	15 September 2015	Brussels	
Ghana	Henry Tachie-Menson	19 September 2024	Brussels	
Greece	Eleftheria Galathianaki	15 September 2015	Brussels	
Grenada	Raphael Joseph		Brussels	
Guatemala	José Gabriel Lambour Peñalonzo		Brussels	
Guinea	Vacant (Mory Camara, Chargé d'affaires a.i.)		Brussels	
Guinea-Bissau	Hélder Jorge Vaz Gomes Lopes		Brussels	
Guyana	Sase H. Singh	19 September 2024	Brussels	
Haiti	Alrich Nicolas		Brussels	
Holy See	Mgr Bernardito Cleopas Auza		Brussels	
Honduras	Vacant (Carlos Eduardo Cano Zuniga, Chargé d'affaires a.i.)		Brussels	
Hungary	Zoltán Nagy	10 March 2015	Brussels	
Iceland	Stefán Haukur Jóhannesson		Brussels	
India	Vacant (Dr. Murugesan Balaji, Chargé d'affaires a.i.)		Brussels	
Indonesia	Andy Rachmianto		Brussels	
Iran	Seyed Mohammad Ali Robatjazi		Brussels	
Iraq	Vacant (Hatim Al-Anbari, Chargé d'affaires a.i.)		Brussels	
Ireland	Eamonn Mac Aodha	13 March 2012	Brussels	
Israel	Avraham Nir		Brussels	
Italy	Andrea Esteban Sama	22 September 2015	Brussels	
Ivory Coast	Vacant (Amenan Mathilde Kra, Chargé d'affaires a.i.)		Brussels	
Jamaica	Diedre Nichole Mills		Brussels	
Japan	Aikawa Kazutoshi		Brussels	
Jordan	Yousef Al-Bataineh		Brussels	
Kazakhstan	Margulan Baimukhan		Brussels	
Kenya	Vacant (Daniel Tanui, Chargé d'affaires a.i.)		Brussels	
Kiribati	Vacant		Brussels	
Kosovo	Bernard Nikaj		Brussels	
Kuwait	Nawaf N. Alenezi		Brussels	
Kyrgyzstan	Aidit Erkin		Brussels	
Laos	Kingphokeo Phommahaxay		Brussels	
Latvia	Aiga Liepiņa		Brussels	
Lebanon	Walid Haidar		Brussels	
Lesotho	Mantoetsi Mohatonyane		Brussels	
Liberia	Levi Demah		Brussels	
Libya	Jalal Mahdi Al Aashi		Brussels	
Liechtenstein	Pascal Schafhauser		Brussels	
Lithuania	Dainius Petras Kamaitis		Brussels	
Luxembourg	Jean-Louis Thill		Brussels	
Madagascar	Vacant (Aly Mirana Tsimbazafy, Chargé d'affaires a.i.)		Brussels	
Malawi	Naomi Aretha Ngwira		Brussels	
Malaysia	Dato' Mohd Khalid Abbasi Bin Ab Razak Khan Abbasi		Brussels	
Maldives	Vacant (Aishath Shahula, Chargé d'affaires a.i.)		Brussels	
Mali	El Hadji Alhousseini Traore		Brussels	
Malta	Clint Tanti		Brussels	
Marshall Islands	Vacant		Brussels	
Mauritania	Mohamed Mahmoud Brahim Khlil		Brussels	
Mauritius	Vacant (Yousouf Mohamed Ramjanally, Chargé d'affaires a.i.)		Brussels	
Mexico	Rogelio Granguillhome Morfin		Brussels	
Micronesia	Vacant (Johnny Hadley, Chargé d'affaires a.i.)		Geneva	
Moldova	Daniela Morari		Brussels	
Monaco	Frédéric Labarrere		Brussels	
Mongolia	Luvsanvandan Bold		Brussels	
Montenegro	Petar Markovic		Brussels	
Morocco	Ahmed Reda Chami		Brussels	
Mozambique	Berta Celestino Cossa		Brussels	
Myanmar	Vacant (Dr Khin Thidar Aye, Chargé d'affaires a.i.)		Brussels	
Namibia	Alfredo Tjiurimo Hengari	24 February 2026	Brussels	
Nauru	Vacant		Brussels	
Nepal	Sewa Lamsal		Brussels	
Netherlands	Brechje Schwachöfer		Brussels	
New Zealand	Simon Joseph Draper		Brussels	
Nicaragua	César Augusto Castañeda Lacayo		Brussels	
Niger	Vacant (Issoufou Garba, Chargé d'affaires a.i.)		Brussels	
Nigeria	Vacant (Faith Ugonna Ekwekwuo, Chargé d'affaires a.i.)		Brussels	
North Korea	Vacant (Kim Chol Jun, Chargé d'affaires a.i.)		Berlin	
North Macedonia	Zulfi Ismaili		Brussels	
Norway	Anders Eide		Brussels	
Oman	Rua Issa Ashraf Al Zadjali		Brussels	
Pakistan	Rahim Hayat Qureshi		Brussels	
Palau	Vacant		Brussels	
Palestine	Amal Jadou	27 November 2024	Brussels	
Panama	Angel Ernesto Riera Diaz		Brussels	
Papua New Guinea	Joseph Varo		Brussels	
Paraguay	Enrique Miguel Franco Maciel		Brussels	
Peru	Luis Enrique Chavez Basagoitia		Brussels	
Philippines	Jaime Victor B. Ledda		Brussels	
Poland	Katarzyna Skórzyńska (Chargé d'affaires a.i.)		Brussels	
Portugal	António Costa Moura		Brussels	
Qatar	Talal bin Almas Al Saleh Al Sulaiti	5 February 2026	Brussels	
Romania	Andreea Păstârnac		Brussels	
Russia	Denis Gonchar		Brussels	
Rwanda	Igor Cesar		Berlin	
Saint Kitts and Nevis	Vacant (Desmond Simon, Chargé d'affaires a.i.)		Brussels	
Saint Lucia	Vacant (Desmond Simon, Chargé d'affaires a.i.)		Brussels	
Saint Vincent and the Grenadines	Vacant (Desmond Simon, Chargé d'affaires a.i.)		Brussels	
Samoa	Francella Maureen Strickland		Brussels	
San Marino	Eros Gasperoni		Brussels	
São Tomé and Príncipe	José Cardoso Cassandra		Brussels	
Saudi Arabia	Haifa Al Jedea		Brussels	
Senegal	Mame Baba Cissé		Brussels	
Serbia	Danijel Apostolović		Brussels	
Seychelles	Kenneth Racombo		Brussels	
Sierra Leone	Philip Bob Jusu		Brussels	
Singapore	Heng Aik Yeow		Brussels	
Slovakia	Tomáš Kozák		Brussels	
Slovenia	Barbara Sušnik		Brussels	
Solomon Islands	Vacant (Martin Kwaifono, Chargé d'affaires a.i.)		Brussels	
Somalia	Khadija Ossoble Ali		Brussels	
South Africa	Tokozile Xasa		Brussels	
South Korea	Vacant (Jooyeon Ellen Kang, Chargé d'affaires a.i.)		Brussels	
South Sudan	Samuel Luate Lominsuk		Brussels	
Spain	José María Rodríguez Coso		Brussels	
Sri Lanka	Wakwalle Kankanamge Chandana Weerasena		Brussels	
Sudan	Abdelbagi Hamdan Kabeir		Brussels	
Suriname	Vacant (Jennifer Olivieira, Chargé d'affaires a.i.)		Brussels	
Sweden	Johanna Brismar Skoog		Brussels	
Switzerland	Rita Adam		Brussels	
Syria	Vacant (Abdullatif Dabbagh, Chargé d'affaires a.i.)		Brussels	
Tajikistan	Muzaffar Huseinzoda		Brussels	
Tanzania	Jestas Abuok Nyamanga		Brussels	
Thailand	Kanchana Patarachoke		Brussels	
Timor-Leste	Maria de Lurdes Martins de Sousa Bessa		Brussels	
Togo	Vacant (Kommabou Fandjinou, Chargé d'affaires a.i.)		Brussels	
Tonga	Vacant		London	
Trinidad and Tobago	Vacant (Tiffany Bethel, Chargé d'affaires a.i.)		Brussels	
Tunisia	Sahbi Khalfallah		Brussels	
Turkey	Yaprak Balkan		Brussels	
Turkmenistan	Sapar Palvanov		Brussels	
Tuvalu	Tine Leuelu		Brussels	
Uganda	Mirjam Blaak Sow		Brussels	
Ukraine	Vsevolod Chentsov		Brussels	
United Arab Emirates	Mohamed Al Sahlawi		Brussels	
United Kingdom	Anne Sherriff	23 October 2024	Brussels	
United States	Bill White	17 November 2025	Brussels	
Uruguay	Jorge Luis Jure Arnoletti		Brussels	
Uzbekistan	Gayrat Fazilov		Brussels	
Vanuatu	Vacant		Brussels	
Venezuela	Claudia Salerno Caldera		Brussels	
Vietnam	Nguyễn Văn Thảo		Brussels	
Yemen	Mohamed Taha Mustafa		Brussels	
Zambia	Sylvester Mundanda		Brussels	
Zimbabwe	Tadeous Chifamba		Brussels	

== See also ==
- List of ambassadors from Belgium
