= Jacques van Ypersele de Strihou =

- Born: 5 December 1936 (age 89); Uccle, Belgium
- Occupations: civil servant, royal secretary

Jacques Marie Joseph Hubert Ghislain van Ypersele de Strihou (born 5 December 1936) was the Principal Private Secretary to the King of the Belgians (1983–2013). When Albert II of Belgium succeeded his brother Baudouin I of Belgium, he kept his private secretary, so Jacques van Ypersele de Strihou has served two kings. Together with Jan Willems, Marshal of the Royal Household, he represents the King at the board of the King Baudouin Foundation.

Jacques van Ypersele de Strihou is a French-speaking Christian Democrat (CDH, previously known as PSC). He is a son of Henry van Ypersele, an engineer who worked for the business group of the late Baron Empain and Martha Bansa de Kinder. Henry van Ypersele was the brother of Baron Adelin van Ypersele de Strihou and himself administrator of Royale Belge, the predecessor of Axa. Jacques van Ypersele de Strihou is married to Brigitte de Bus de Warnaffe and together they have four daughters: Marie-Noëlle, Vinciane, Christina and Nathalie. His daughter, Nathalie van Ypersele de Strihou, is a partner of the Belgian PR consultancy agency akkanto.

Jacques van Ypersele de Strihou is nicknamed "Van Yp" in Belgium's political and media circles.

== Education ==
Jacques van Ypersele went to school at the Jesuit college Saint-Michel of Brussels. He studied literature at the Facultés universitaires Notre-Dame de la Paix (FUNDP) in Namur and in addition he studied law and economy at the Catholic University of Louvain. During his studies, he was a member of the Olivaint Conference of Belgium. He was an assistant at Lovanium University of Léopoldville in Congo for some months, after which he went to Yale University, on a NATO-scholarship, where he obtained a PhD in economics under Richard Cooper.

== Career ==
In Washington, D.C., he met professor Robert Triffin, of the International Monetary Fund (IMF). Robert Triffin, his mentor, provided him with a job at the IMF in Washington, D.C., and later in 1969 at Jakarta (Indonesia). In Washington, D.C., at the IMF, he shared a room, as a junior economist, with Wim Duisenberg, the later President of the European Central Bank. Due to his talent, he acquired international fame in a short time. State leaders, such as the German chancellor Helmut Schmidt and the French president Valéry Giscard d'Estaing praised his expertise on economics and finance. In the early 1970s he returned to Belgium, where he joined the Empain Group, and became Vice-President of Electrorail. In 1972, he became an advisor at the cabinet of André Vlerick. He became consultant of three successive Belgian Ministers for Finance: Willy De Clercq, Gaston Geens and in 1981, of Robert Vandeputte. In 1976, he was appointed by Willy De Clercq as inspector-general of the Belgian treasury. In 1978, he became (vice-) Chief of Cabinet of Leo Tindemans, and later also of Paul Vanden Boeynants, and Wilfried Martens.

Between 1972 and 1983, he taught at the Université Catholique de Louvain (UCL) and the Institut Catholique des Hautes Etudes Commerciales (ICHEC) in Brussels. At the end of the 1970s, he was President of the Monetary Committee of the European Union, and played a particularly important role in the design and establishment of the European Monetary System (EMS). In 1981, together with Alfons Verplaetse, he was one of the architects of the devaluation of the Belgian Franc, in order to stimulate the Belgian economy. In 1983, he succeeded Jean-Marie Piret and became principal private secretary of Baudouin I of Belgium, and later also of his brother Albert II of Belgium, until the latter's abdication on 21 July 2013. As one of his final acts of his reign, Albert II appointed van Ypersele de Strihou as a Minister of State.

Jacques van Ypersele de Strihou is a member of the monetary committee of the European Union, and also works for the IMF and the Worldbank as a financial expert.

== Private ==
Van Ypersele is married to Brigitte du Bus de Warnaffe and have 4 daughters.

=== Honours ===
==== National Honours ====
- Belgium:
  - Knight Grand Cross in the Order of the Crown.
  - 2013: Minister of State

==== Foreign honours ====
- Austria: Grand Cross in the Order of Merit, Austria
- Germany: Grand Cross in the Order of Merit of the Federal Republic of Germany
- Italy: Grand Cross of the Order of Merit of the Italian Republic (20/02/1986)
- Luxembourg: Grand Cross in the Order of Adolphe of Nassau
- Norway: Grand Cross in the Order of merit, Norway
- The Netherlands: Grand Cross in the Order of Orange-Nassau
- Mexico: Grand Cross in the Order of the Aztec Eagle
- Poland: Commander in the Order of Merit of the Republic of Poland, 2004.
- Portugal: Grand Cross in the Order of Merit, 2006.
- Spain: Grand Cross in the Order of Civil Merit, Spain.
- Sweden: Grand Cross in the Order of the Polar Star

== See also ==
- Michel Didisheim
- André Molitor

== Sources ==
- King Baudouin Foundation (press release)
- Gui Polspoel, Pol Van den Driessche, Koning en onderkoning. Over de invloed van het Hof en de macht van Jacques van Ypersele de Strihou, Leuven, Van Halewyck, 2001
- Jan Van Den Berghe, Noblesse Oblige, Kroniek van de Belgische adel, Globe, Roularta books, Groot-Bijgaarden, 1997, pp. 171 – 178
- Willem F Duisenberg: Congratulatory speech at the National Bank of Belgium’s 150th anniversary

Political offices
Preceded by Jean-Marie Piret	private secretary of His Majesty's Cabinet; 1983–2013	Succeeded by Frans van Daele
