= Jean-Arthur Régibeau =

Belgium diplomat

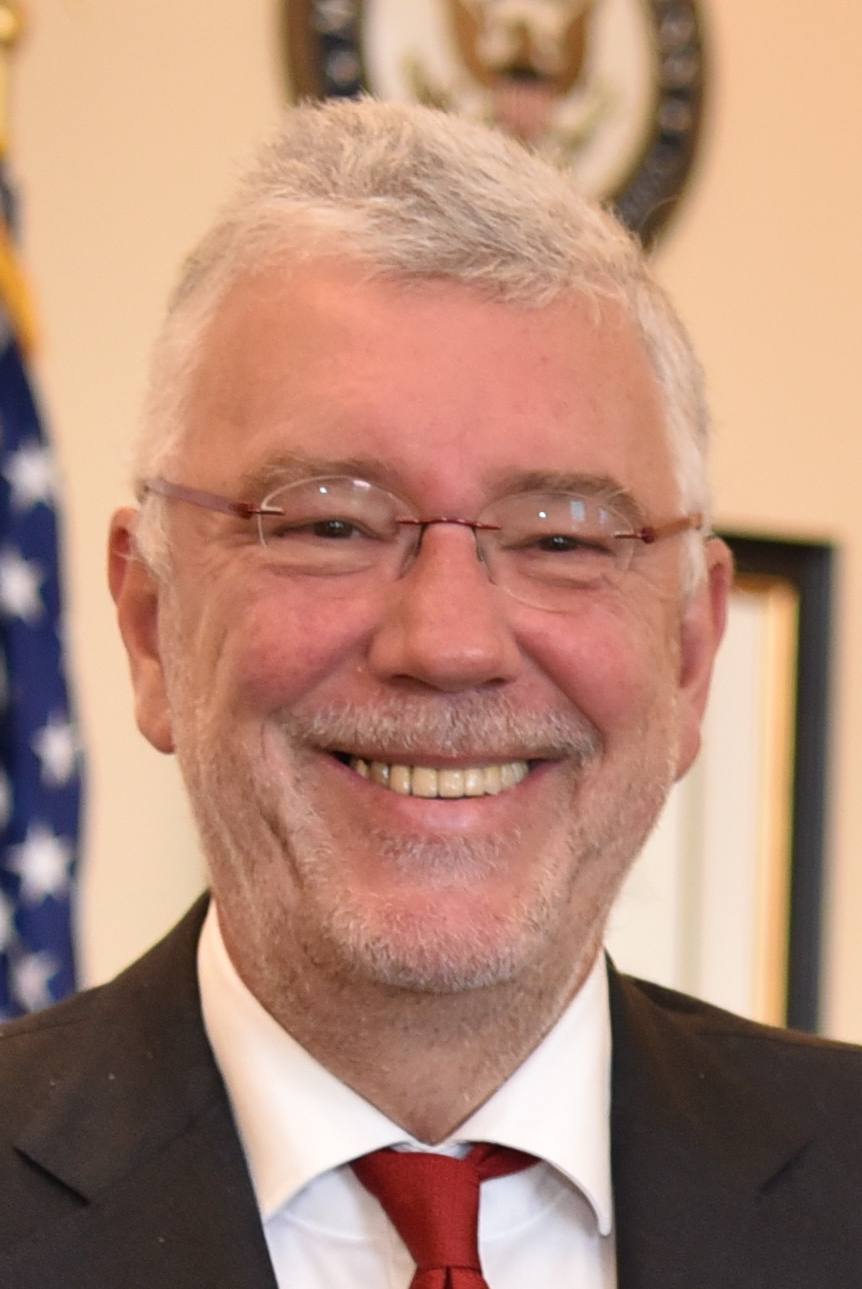

Ambassador of Belgium to the United States
- In office September 2020 – July 2024
- Prime Minister: Alexander De Croo
- Preceded by: Dirk Wouters

Personal details
- Born: 1962 (age 63–64) Liège, Belgium
- Children: 1
- Education: University of Liège; University of Leiden

Jean-Arthur Régibeau (born 1962, Liège, Belgium) is the former ambassador of Belgium to the United States.

== Education ==
Régibeau earned a master's degree in law at the University of Liège in 1984, a certificate in international law from the State University of Leiden (Netherlands) in 1985 and a diploma in international relations from the Johns Hopkins University in Bologna, Italy in 1986.

== Diplomatic career ==
Régibeau started his diplomatic career in the Belgian Federal Public Service Foreign Affairs in 1998. From 1999 to 2002, he was the diplomatic advisor to the Minister of Defense and served later as first secretary at the Belgian diplomatic mission in Berlin. He returned to Brussels in 2003, where he served as head of the Private Office of the Minister of Defense until 2007. In the same year, he was appointed Director General in charge of Multilateral Organizations at the Foreign Ministry where he led some aspects of the Belgian Presidency of the European Union in 2010. Following his service as Deputy Commissioner for the commemoration of World War I from 2012 to 2016, Régibeau started his role as ambassador to Armenia, Belarus, Uzbekistan and the Russian Federation. From 2020 to 2024, Régibeau was the ambassador of Belgium to the United States of America.

== Personal life ==
Régibeau has one adult daughter.

== Papers and presentations ==
- La doctrine nucléaire française et sa dimension européenne, Nice, 1987
- Les causes profondes du 11 septembre in Democracy after September 11, University of Liège, 2004
