= Jean de Ruyt =

Belgian diplomat (born 1947)

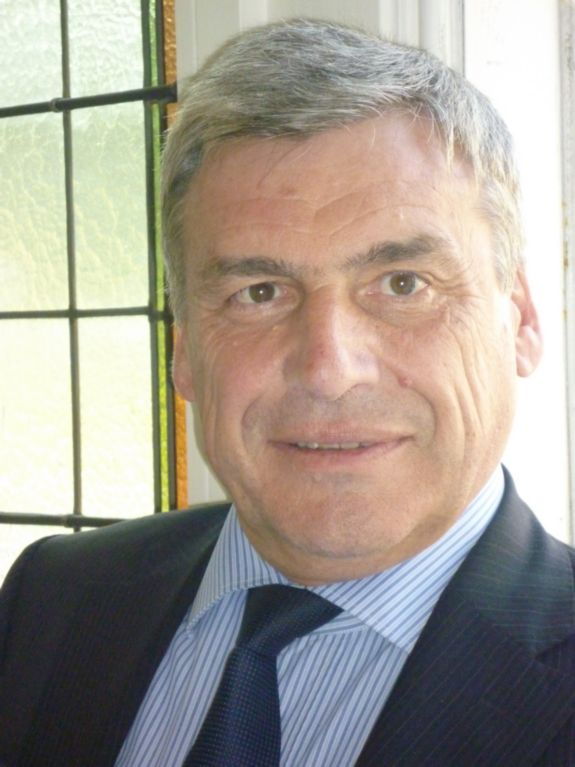
Jean De Ruyt

Ambassador Jean De Ruyt (born 14 September 1947) retired from the Belgian diplomatic service in March 2012 after some 40 years. Now an independent consultant and political analyst Jean De Ruyt currently consults for Covington & Burling LLP as Senior Advisor and for other consulting firms for EU affairs and security issues. He is a member of the Belgian Royal Academy.

== Career ==
Ambassador Jean De Ruyt was the Permanent Representative of Belgium to the European Union until September 2011. He was then appointed to advise the European Union's High Representative / Vice-President Catherine Ashton on specific foreign policy issues. He was previously Ambassador to Italy, covering also, from Rome, the FAO (UN Food and Agricultural Organization), Albania and the Republic of San Marino. From April 2001 until August 2004 he was the Permanent Representative of Belgium to the United Nations in New York. In this capacity and as the Representative of the European Union Presidency in 2001, he contributed actively in the UN reaction to the events of 11 September 2001.

His first diplomatic postings were in Kinshasa, Algiers and the Industrial Development Office in New York. He served from 1982 until 1987 in the Permanent Representation of Belgium to the EU as the assistant to the Ambassador (Antici). In 1987, he was appointed deputy Chief of Mission in the Belgian Embassy in Washington where he served until mid-1991.

During the 1990s, his diplomatic career allowed him to participate closely in the shaping of the new European Security Architecture emerging after the end of the cold war. First as Senior official to the CSCE and Ambassador to the Western European Union (WEU), then as Ambassador to Poland (1994–1996), Permanent Representative to the NATO Council (1996–1997) and Belgian Member of the Political Committee of the European Union (1997–2001).

De Ruyt has a doctorate from Louvain University Law School (1969) and studied at the Johns Hopkins School of Advanced International Studies. He was Assistant Professor in Public Law at Louvain University before entering the Diplomatic career. Since his return to Brussels in 2007, he is a regular visiting professor at Louvain University (UCL) and in the College of Europe in Poland (Natolin). He has conducted seminars on European issues for the joint European Studies Institute of Louvain and St Louis Universities and sits on the Board of The Royal Institute for International Relations, the Egmont Institute

== Published works ==
His publications include L 'Acte Unique Européen Editions de l’Université de Bruxelles 1987, second Edition 1989; European Political Cooperation towards a European Foreign Policy, Atlantic Council of the U.S., 1989; A Minister for a European Foreign Policy, Schuman Centre, European University Institute, Florence, 2005 and various articles on European institutions and defence policy. 'Leadership in the European Union' was published by Louvain University Press. ‘Le Privilege du Diplomate’, reflections on 40 years of diplomatic career was published in September 2021 by Les Presses Universitaires de Louvain. His latest book ‘de six a Trente-six’, about the enlargement of the European Union was published by the Belgian Royal Academy in February 2025.

== Personal life ==
Jean De Ruyt was born in Louvain, Belgium on 14 September 1947. He is married to Sheila Arora and has five children: Carole, Isabelle, Virginie, Laurent and Amber.
