= Johan Swinnen (diplomat) =

Belgian diplomat

- Born: 1947 (age 78–79); Belgium
- Education: Catholic University of Leuven; Graduate Institute of International Studies, Geneva
- Occupation: Diplomat
- Organizations: United Nations Legal Service; International Peace Information Service (Chair since 2015)
- Known for: Early warnings during the Rwandan genocide
- Notable work: Reports on Rwanda (1992–1994)
- Title: Ambassador; Baron (since 2014)

Johan Swinnen (born 1947) is a Belgian diplomat who was ambassador in Rwanda during the Rwandan genocide.

== Life ==
=== Education ===
Johan Swinnen obtained a doctorate in law and a license in notarial law from the Catholic University of Leuven (1834–1968). He also studied international law at the Graduate Institute of International Studies in Geneva. In 1973, he became an assistant to the Executive Secretariat in preparation for the Conference on Security and Co-operation in Europe in Geneva, and in 1975 he joined the United Nations Legal Service. From 1988 to 1990, he was the spokesman for Foreign Affairs Department.

=== Career ===
Swinnen was ambassador in Kigali from 1990 to 1994. He is known for sending Brussels early warnings of what became the upcoming Rwandan genocide while ambassador in Rwanda. In 1992, he cabled Brussels that the Interahamwe militia had taken part in the carefully planned killings of around 300 Tutsis in southeastern Rwanda's Bugesera District. In January 1994, several months before the Rwandan genocide, he warned Brussels about calls on the radio for the extermination of the Tutsi. He warned that as long as the United Nations Assistance Mission for Rwanda did not intervene, arms would be distributed to the Interahamwe.

He was successively ambassador in The Hague (1997-2002), Kinshasa (2004–2008) and Madrid (2009-2011).

Swinnen has also been a diplomatic advisor to Prime Minister Jean-Luc Dehaene.

Since 2015, he is chair of the board of the Brussels-based International Peace Information Service, an independent think tank that works on peace, sustainable development and human rights.

=== Recognition ===
In 2014, Philippe of Belgium granted him the noble title of baron.
