= Frans van Daele =

Belgian diplomat

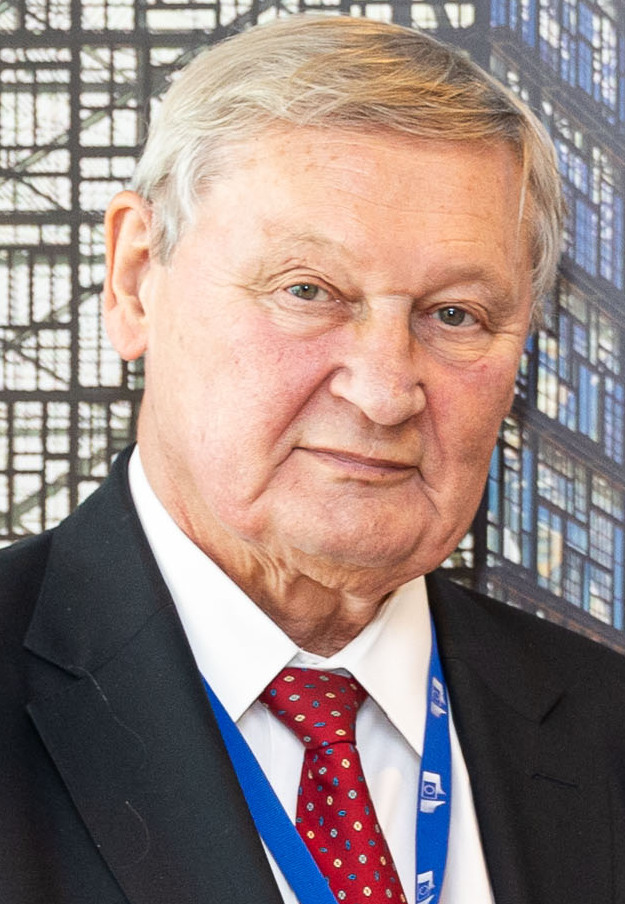
Baron van Daele in 2023

Franciskus Romanus Rumoldus, Baron van Daele (born October 24, 1947, in Oostburg), is a Belgian diplomat who served as the private secretary of His Majesty's Cabinet.

== Early life and education ==
Franciskus (Frans) van Daele has a master's degree in philosophy and arts (Romance philology) from the Catholic University of Leuven, Belgium.

He speaks and writes Dutch, French, English, German and Italian.

== Career ==
Van Daele joined the Belgian Foreign Service in 1971. His career has included several bilateral and multilateral assignments.

After a first term at his country's Permanent Mission to the European Union (1973–77), he served in Athens as First Secretary (1977–81) and in Rome as Minister-Counselor (1986–89).

Between these two postings he served a second time at Belgium's Permanent Mission to the EU (as Antici, i.e. Chief of Staff to the Ambassador) and then in 1984-86 as press spokesman of the Foreign Ministry under Minister Leo Tindemans.

He was Deputy Permanent Representative of the Belgian Mission to the United Nations in New York between 1989 and 1993, and alternate Representative to the UN Security Council of which Belgium was a non-permanent member in 1991–92.

When this tour of duty ended, he was appointed Director General for Political Affairs at the Belgian Foreign Ministry (1994–97). In that capacity he was a member of the Political Committee which ran the foreign policy agenda of the E.U. As his assignment covered not only Belgium's foreign and security policy but also the coordination of its EU policy, he led Belgium's interagency coordination for the negotiation of the Treaty of Amsterdam.

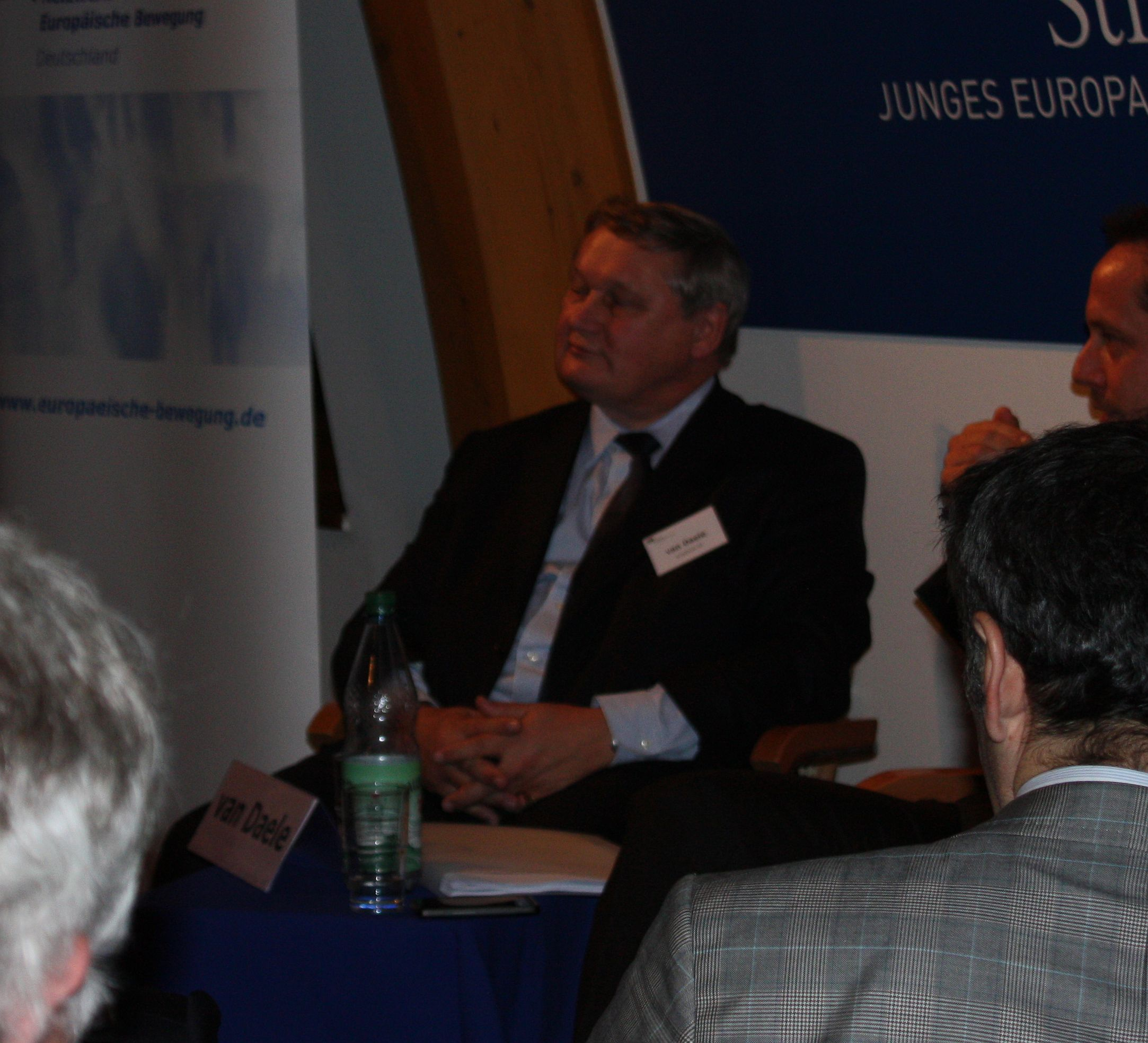
Baron van Daele in 2010

Subsequently, from 1997 to 2002, van Daele was Ambassador and Permanent Representative to the European Union in Brussels. During this period, he was Belgium's negotiator for the Treaty of Nice. During Belgium's rotating presidency of the Council of the European Union (July - December 2001), he chaired the Committee of Permanent Representatives. He co-authored the Laeken Declaration which laid the ground for the Treaty of Lisbon. Moreover, during this period he was deeply involved in the negotiation of the many European measures taken to fight terrorism in the wake of 9/11 (European arrest warrant; common criminal law definition of terrorism and minimum sanction rules).

Between 2002 and 2006, van Daele served as Belgium's Ambassador to the US, where he closely followed American political and economic developments under the first and the second George W. Bush administrations.

After a term as Belgium's Permanent Representative to NATO (2007-2009), he became Chief of Staff to the Minister of Foreign Affairs Yves Leterme.

In November 2009 he joined the President of the European Council, Herman Van Rompuy, as Chief of Staff. Between November 2009 and November 2012, Baron van Daele was not only closely involved in economic, financial and monetary matters, related to the euro crisis, and as well in the relations between the EU and its strategic partners. He represented President Van Rompuy and President José Manuel Durao Barroso as their sherpa in preparing the G8 Summits in Muskoka (2010), in Deauville (2011), and in Camp David (2012), and as their deputy-sherpa for the G20 Summits in Toronto (2010), in Seoul (2010), in Cannes (2011), and in Los Cabos (2012). Under mandatory retirement rules, van Daele left his position as Chief of Staff of the President of the European Union.

In 2013, upon the abdication of King Albert II of the Belgians, Baron van Daele became the first chief of the private royal cabinet of King Philippe of the Belgians. He succeeded Jacques van Ypersele and held the office from 2013 to 2017, when he was succeeded by Vincent Houssiau. Upon his retirement he was made a Minister of State.

== Other activities ==
Throughout his career, Van Daele has kept up his strong interest both in history and in current economic and political problems. He often spoke in public about foreign policy questions, European integration and macro-economic/financial developments. He collaborated in several research projects dealing with contemporary Belgian and EU foreign policy. He gave occasional lectures at the universities of Brussels, Liège, Antwerp and Ghent, and he cooperated on a regular basis with his alma mater, the University of Leuven (post-graduate program in European Studies, and occasional lectures in the faculty of Law and Political Sciences) of which he presides the Alumni Association (Alumni Lovanienses) since 2008. He occasionally lectured at the Universities of Leiden and Maastricht, and at Stanford University. He has been invited as a Distinguished Fellow of Johns Hopkins’ SAIS In Washington and in 2013 he taught a special Seminar on the European Council at the College d’Europe both in Bruges and in Natolin.

Baron van Daele is a member of the Board of the University of Leuven, of the Board of the Chapelle musicale Reine Elisabeth, of the advisory board of the Friends of Europe and he is a member of the Fondation Jean Monnet (Lausanne). He is a board member of AECA. He sits on the Board of the Fondation Inbev – Baillet-Latour, and on the Board of the Arenberg Foundation. He is president of the Royal Association of Belgian Nobility.

He was declared a noble lord in 2003, and in 2006 he and his descendants were given the title Baron(ess) van Daele.

== Honours ==
- Belgium:
  - Grand-croix in the Order of the Crown
  - Grand officer in the Order of Leopold II.
- Greece:
  - Grand officer in the Order of the Phoenix
  - Grand officer in the Order of merit
- Italy: Grand officer in the Order of Merit of the Italian Republic
- Mexico: Commander of the Order of the Aztec Eagle.

== Sources ==
Political offices
| Preceded by Jacques van Ypersele de Strihou | private secretary of His Majesty's Cabinet; 2013–2017 | Succeeded by Vincent Houssiau |
