= Claude Rijmenans =

Belgian ambassador

Claude Rijmenans (born November 10, 1948) is a retired Belgian ambassador.

== Early life ==
Rijmenans was born in Rome, Italy on November 10, 1948. Rijmenans is the son of H.E. Marcel Rijmenans, ambassador of H.M. the King of the Belgians. He performed his primary and high school education in Belgium, the United States ([[San Francisco]|San Francisco, California]]) and in the Federal Republic of Germany (Bonn), and graduated in social sciences from the Free University of Brussels (1972).

== Career ==
Rijmenans was a reserve officer in the Royal Belgian Air Force from 1973-1974.

He was sworn into the Diplomatic Service on January 1, 1977. Ambassador Claude Rijmenans was promoted to the rank of Minister Plenipotentiary on January 1, 1994. On March 1, 2006 he was promoted to the first class, the Belgian equivalent of full ambassadorial rank.

He retired on December 1, 2013, at the mandatory age of 65. By Royal Decree, he retains the honour of his ambassadorial rank.

=== Ambassadorial postings ===
- 1976–1980: Bangkok (Second Secretary)
- 1980–1984: London (First Secretary)
- 1984–1985: Mexico (Counsellor)
- 1985–1988: MFA Brussels (Chef de Cabinet of the Minister for Foreign Trade, Deputy Secretary General of the Benelux EU)
- 1988–1992: Casablanca (Consul General)
- 1992–1996: Toronto (Consul General)
- 1996–1999: MFA Brussels (Director Central and Eastern European Desk, Director General of Foreign Economic Relations a.i., Deputy Director General of Bilateral Relations and Director of the European Desk).
- 1999–2004: Athens (Ambassador)
- 2004–2009: Madrid (Ambassador)
- 2009–2010: Vienna (Ambassador –bilateral Austria and Bosnia-Herzegovina- and Permanent Representative to the International Organizations in Vienna)
- 2010– MFA Brussels (Ambassador, Special Envoy for Asylum and Migration – from August 1, 2011).

=== Diplomatic work ===
During his stay in Bangkok, he was actively involved in the refugee crisis and attended a series of ESCAP meetings. In London, he dealt mainly with economic affairs and was chairman of various commodities organizations. In Mexico, he became Deputy Chief of Mission and dealt with the financial dossiers of Belgian companies. In Brussels, he became “Chef de Cabinet” of the Minister for Foreign Trade and organized various missions. In Casablanca, he became Chief of Mission and promoted Belgian economic interests in Morocco. In Toronto, he covered as Consul General a jurisdiction stretching from Ontario to British Columbia. In Athens, during his mission, the State visit of the King of the Belgians Albert II and Queen Paola took place in 2001.

In Madrid, he concentrated his efforts on creating a close working relationship on European Union issues and OSCE matters with the Spanish MFA. In Vienna, he represented Belgium bilaterally towards Austria and Bosnia-Herzegovina, and multilaterally in international organizations. As Ambassador, Special envoy for Asylum and Migration, he represented Belgium in the EU’s High Level Working Group on Migration (HLWG) and coordinated the various Belgian actors active in these fora.

=== Accolades ===
Various Belgian and foreign distinctions: grand officer in the Order of Leopold II, commander in the Order of Leopold, commander in the Order of the Crown, Grand Cross in the Order of the Phoenix (Greece), commander in the Order of the Aztec Eagle (Mexico), etc.

He presented the "Concours diplomatique" of 1974, and was received as major of his promotion. Having completed his military duties, he entered the Belgian Diplomatic Service on January 1, 1975 as a trainee. During his traineeship, he was posted in The Hague in 1975.
