= Marchienne =

Marchienne may refer to:

- R.O.C. de Charleroi-Marchienne, Royal Olympic Club de Charleroi-Marchienne is a Belgian football club from the city of Charleroi, Hainaut.
- Marchienne-au-Pont, a section of the Belgian town of Charleroi within the Walloon region in the Province of Hainaut
- Mont-sur-Marchienne, a section of the Belgian town of Charleroi within the Walloon region in the Province of Hainaut

== People ==
- Emile de Cartier de Marchienne (1871–1946), Belgian diplomat
- Fernande de Cartier de Marchienne (1872–1903), mother of Marguerite Yourcenar
- Louis de Cartier de Marchienne (1921–2013), Belgian businessman. He was managing director of the company Eternit in the sixties
- Jean-Louis de Cartier de Marchienne, Belgian businessman. He is a member of the board and Managing Director of Carta Mundi

== See also ==
- Tilloy-lez-Marchiennes, a commune in the Nord department in northern France
- Bruille-lez-Marchiennes, a commune in the Nord department in northern France
- Marchiennes Abbey, a French monastery located on the Scarpe in Marchiennes . It was founded around 630 by Adalbaud, duc de Douai
