= Barbe Le Clerch =

Breton illegalist anarchist (1891–c.1920)

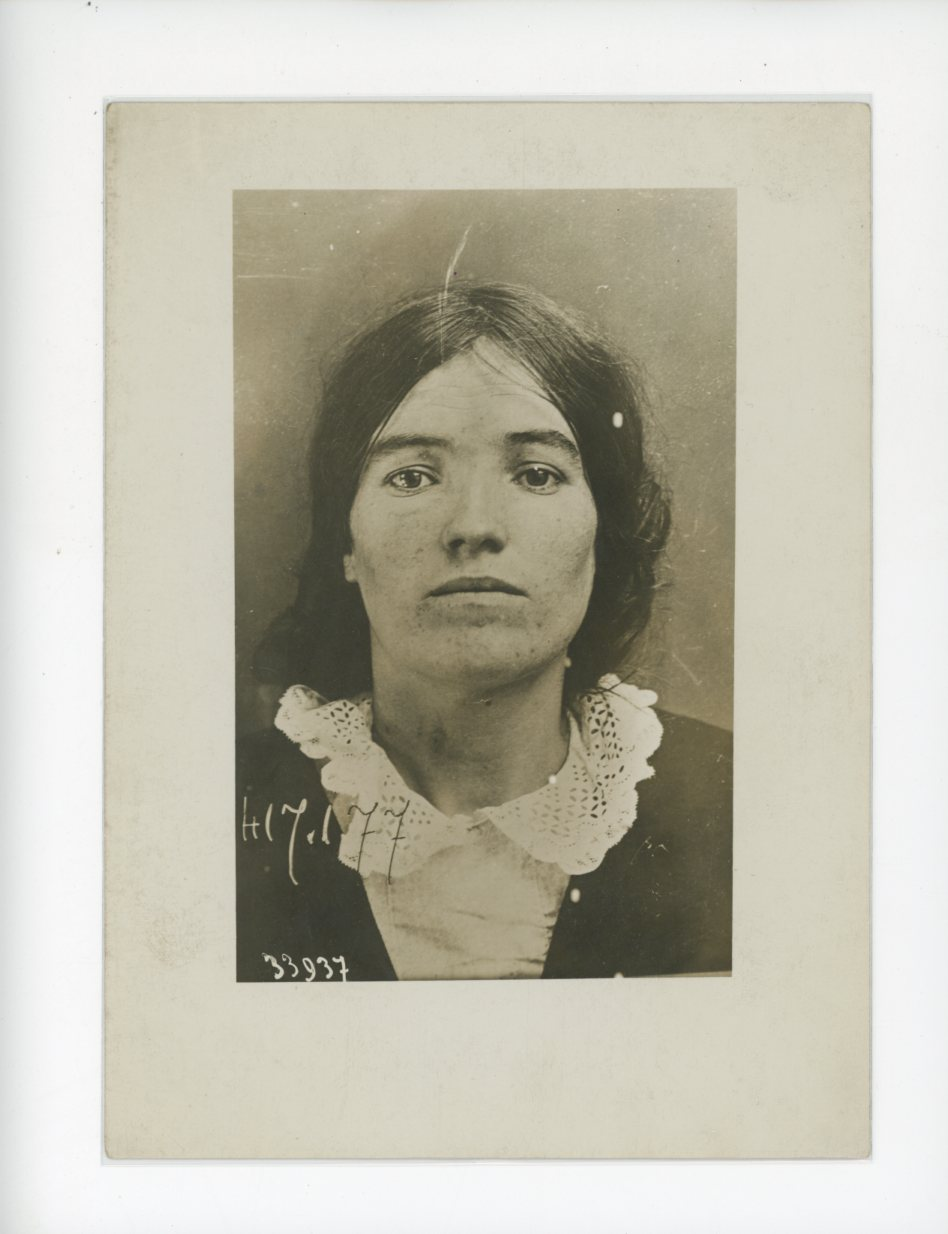
- Le Clerch after her arrest (1912)
- Born: Barbe Marie Josèphe Le Clerch; 5 February 1891; Le Faouët, Brittany, France
- Died: c. 1920
- Organisation: Bonnot Gang
- Movement: Anarchism in France
- Partner: Marius Metge
- Parents: Jean Louis Le Clerch (father); Françoise Bérréat (mother)

Barbe Marie Josèphe Le Clerch (Note: Surname also spelt Leclech, Le Clech or Le Clerc'h) (1891–c. 1920) was a Breton domestic worker and illegalist anarchist, linked to the Bonnot Gang.

== Biography ==
Le Clerch was born on 5 February 1891, in the town of Le Faouët, in the Morbihan department of Brittany. She was the eldest child of the day labourers Françoise Bérréat and Jean Louis Le Clerch, the latter of whom died while she was still young. She was raised by her mother in poverty and never received a literary education. At only 10 years old, she was forced to find a job as a domestic worker.

Le Clerch was one of over 12,000 Bretons who migrated to the French capital of Paris for work. There she met and fell in love with the illegalist anarchist Marius Metge, with whom she lived in Romainville. Le Clerch lived in Romainville from December 1910 to April 1911. During this time, she worked as a domestic servant in Les Pavillons-sous-Bois and provided information about the property she worked in to Metge, who later burgled the residence. They briefly moved to Suresnes, before moving on to Garches. There they stayed in a bungalow known as "Holly Oak", where they provided a hiding place for Édouard Carouy while he was being trailed by a journalist. Over the subsequent year, they carried out a series of burglaries in order to sustain themselves. On 2 January 1912, Metge and Carouy carried out a robbery of a wealthy landlord's house in Thiais. They got away with roughly 10,000 francs, while Metge also took an umbrella and earrings to give to Le Clerch as gifts.

Following the robbery, on 10 January, police launched a raid on the house of Louis Rimbault, where Le Clerch and Metge had stayed. By this time, Le Clerch, Metge and Carouy had already fled their house in Garches, fearing that they were being watched. On 14 January, police arrested Metge, but Le Clerch managed to escape capture. Police found Metge's palm print at a house on Place du Havre and found jewelry which had been stolen from the house at Le Clerch's residence. On 6-7 May 1912, police arrested Le Clerch and her new companion, another illegalist anarchist named Edouard Forget, on Rue Du Couédic. Le Clerch was caught in possession of over 900 francs, as well as items stolen from Les Pavillons-sous-Bois.

Le Clerch was incarcerated in Saint-Lazare Prison, together with two other women of the Bonnot Gang: Marie Vuillemin and Rirette Maîtrejean, the latter of whom taught Le Clerch how to read. Le Clerch's physical health deteriorated in prison, as she had contracted tuberculosis. On 15 August 1912, she was granted compassionate release on medical grounds. She was given a place to stay at the offices of L'Anarchie, ran by Émile Armand. She later moved to Rue des Panoyaux, where on 9 November, she was again arrested together with her new companion Indalecio Ibañez, charged with having attacked a post office in Bezons.

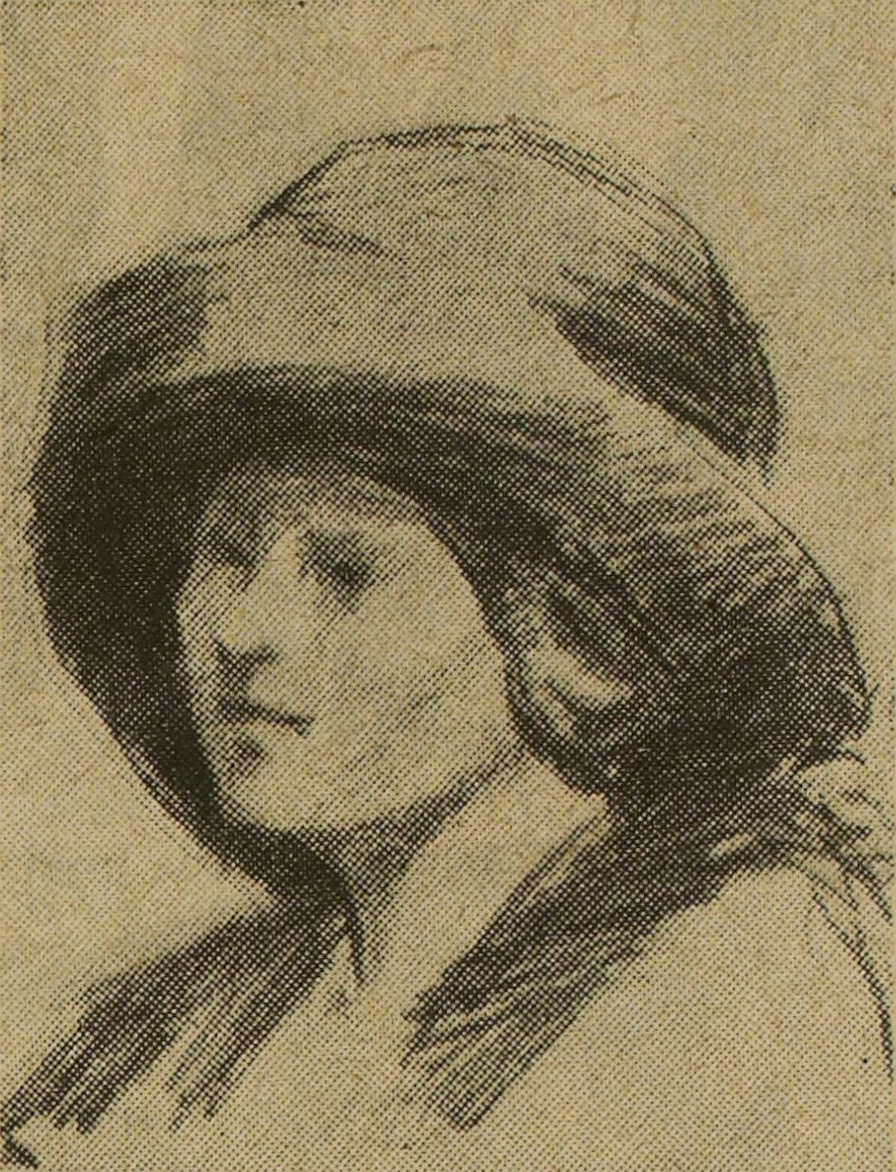
Courtroom sketch of Le Clerch during her trial in February 1913

Le Clerch was accused of complicity in theft and her trial began on 3 February 1913. Together with Vuillemin and Maîtrejean, the prosecution defined her by her gender rather than her alleged role in any criminal activity. Metge himself confessed to participating in the burglary in Les Pavillons-sous-Bois, and admitted to having given Le Clerch some earrings and 1,300 francs which he claimed to have been given by "a friend", who he refused to name. At 05:00 on 25 February, Le Clerch, Maîtrejean, Vuillemin, and Léon Rodriguez were summoned to the court room. The jury found them not guilty on all charges. Having escaped conviction, Le Clerch returned to her life in Paris, where she lived under a pseudonym. On 28 March 1914, she testified in the case against Indalecio Ibañez, but her defense of her companion was unsuccessful and he was given a life sentence of penal labour.

Few records exist of Le Clerch after 1914. According to her grandnieces, she went on to have two children and worked at a cooperative. Victor Serge wrote that she died shortly after her trial, but her family mention her having been visited by her younger sister around 1920; her own family do not know the details of her death.

== Bibliography ==
- Merriman, John (2017). Ballad of the Anarchist Bandits: The Crime Spree that Gripped Belle Époque Paris. Nation Books. ISBN 978-1-56858-988-6.
- Parry, Richard (1987). The Bonnot Gang. London: Rebel Press. ISBN 0-946061-04-1.
- Steiner, Anne (10 October 2022) [2014-05-01]. "LE CLERCH (ou Le CLERC'H) Barbe, Marie, Josèphe". Dictionnaire des anarchistes (in French). Éditions de l'Atelier.
