= Écho de la Sambre =

French-language Belgian newspaper

- Type: Weekly
- Founded: 1915
- Political alignment: Socialist
- Language: French language
- Headquarters: Marchienne-au-Pont

Écho de la Sambre (French pronunciation: [eko də la sɑ̃bʁ], lit. 'The Sambre Echo') was a French-language weekly socialist newspaper published from Marchienne-au-Pont, Belgium. The paper was started in 1915.
