= Georges Butaud =

Belgian-born French anarchism and veganism activist (1868–1926)

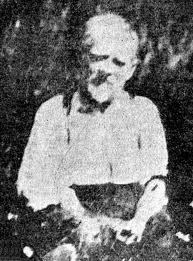
- Born: 6 June 1868; Marchienne-au-Pont, Belgium
- Died: 26 February 1926 (aged 57); Ermont, France
- Occupation(s): Anarchist and veganism activist

Georges Butaud (6 June 1868 – 26 February 1926) was a Belgian-born French individualist anarchist and veganism activist. He advocated naturist anarchism and founded early vegan restaurants in Paris and Nice.

== Biography ==
Butaud was born on 6 June 1868 in Marchienne-au-Pont, Belgium, to French parents. He founded a vegan colony with Sophie Zaïkowska in Bascon, near Château-Thierry. Butaud and Zaïkowska eliminated all dairy products and sugar from their diet and consumed only plant products. He founded Le Végétalien, a vegan journal. The word végétalien was later termed vegan in English.

Butaud with help from Émile Armand founded the La Vie Anarchiste journal. In the 1920s, he contributed to the journal Le Néo-Naturien, which advocated a return to nature philosophy.

Butaud wrote an article in 1922 defending Le végétalisme (veganism). In 1923, Butaud established a vegan restaurant Foyer Végétalien at Rue Mathis, Paris. He also established another restaurant at Nice, in 1924. One could sleep there and conferences were also hosted.

Butaud firmly opposed hunting and linked human cruelty to animals to the capitalist economic system that exploited the consumers of animal products. He advocated a fruit and vegetable diet and believed that humans were meant to be herbivores that share their food sources; thus vegans were bound to be good communists.

Butaud died on 26 February 1926 in Ermont, France.

== Selected publications ==
- Les conséquences pratiques du végétalisme intégral sur l'évolution individuelle et sociale par (The practical consequences of integral veganism on individual and social evolution, 1922)
- L'Individualisme conduit au Robinsonisme: Le Végétalisme permet le communisme (1929)

== See also ==
- History of veganism
- Louis Rimbault
