= Jean-Louis de Cartier de Marchienne =

Belgian businessman (born 1962)

- Born: 1962 (age 63–64)
- Occupation: Businessman
- Known for: Board member and managing director of Cartamundi

Baron Jean-Louis de Cartier de Marchienne (born 1962) is a Belgian businessman and farmer. He is a member of the board and managing director of Carta Mundi, the world leader in the production of playing cards.

== Early life ==
He is the son of Baron Louis de Cartier de Marchienne (1921–2013) and the former Viviane Emsens. His father was adopted by their distant relative, Ambassador Emile de Cartier de Marchienne in 1946, changing their surname from de Cartier into de Cartier de Marchienne. In 1968, his father was made a hereditary baron.

His paternal grandparents were Josa (née Versteylen) de Cartier and Col. Raoul de Cartier. His uncle, Raoul de Cartier, a member of the Belgian Resistance during World War II, was captured by the Germans and executed in 1944. Another uncle, Baron Paul-Ernest de Cartier, joined the Belgian army after the Liberation. During the War, his father was sent to the concentration camp Sachsenhausen, but escaped and joined the Red Army, returning to Belgium after the war. His father was managing director of the Eternit in the 1960s. Through his mother, he is a descendant of Belgian industrialist Alphonse Emsens, who founded Etex in 1905.

== Career ==
Between 1984 and 1991, he was involved in the establishment of several agricultural companies in Belgium with branches in Hungary and the Netherlands. In 1992, he became a member of the board of directors of publishing house Brepols in Turnhout, where his father was also a board member. In 1995, he became chairman of the board of directors of Brepols and its subsidiaries. In 1998, he became managing director and chairman of Cartamundi, a card game producer also based in Turnhout and of which the de Cartier family is a shareholder. He is chairman of the Belgian publishing house Brepols and joined the board of Dutch industrial minerals company, Sibelco, in 2020.

== See also ==
- Emile de Cartier de Marchienne
- Louis de Cartier de Marchienne

== Sources ==
- Carta Mundi
