= Louis Rimbault =

French individualist anarchist

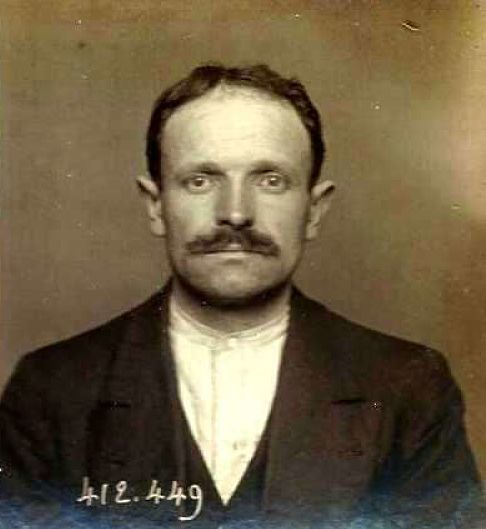
- 1912 mugshot
- Born: 9 April 1877; Tours, France
- Died: 10 November 1949 (aged 72); Luynes, France
- Occupation(s): Individualist anarchist, vegan
- Spouse: Marie Clémence Charlotte Paquet (m. 1899; died 1927)

Louis Rimbault (9 April 1877 – 10 November 1949) was a French individualist anarchist and promoter of simple living and veganism.

== Biography ==
Rimbault was born in Tours from a poor family. By the age of 30 he had become a militant individualist anarchist. He married Marie Clémence Charlotte Paquet on 4 December 1899.

Rimbault was active in individualist circles and became teetotal and a vegan. In 1911, he became associated with Georges Butaud and Sophie Zaïkowska and their vegan community in Bascon, near Château-Thierry. Rimbault worked as a locksmith and operated a garage in Les Pavillons-sous-Bois. In 1912, he was arrested in connection with the Bonnot Gang. He is suspected, without evidence, of having housed gang members. He was acquitted by the Seine Assize Court on 10 August 1914.

In the early 1920s, Rimbault contributed to the libertarian naturist magazine Le Néo-Naturien. He also created a Basconnaise, "salad of infinite variety". This vegan recipe had thirty ingredients of non-animal products and became a well known French vegan dish. In 1925, Rimbault severed connection with Butaud and Zaïkowska and criticized them for launching a new magazine the Le Végétalien, whose competition led to the decline of the Le Néo-Naturien. However, he still considered Butaud his "master in veganism".

Rimbault contributed an article to the Anarchist Encyclopedia and to the individualist anarchist L'En-Dehors newspaper. Rimbault promoted his vegan diet based on mostly medical and physiological arguments. He did not explicitly discuss the role of veganism in ecology but was opposed to the suffering of any animal by man. He believed that the consumption of meat was murder and that vivisection or any form of violence exerted on animals was a crime against nature. Rimbault was a proponent of naturism and authored a brochure entitled The Origins of Human Life Revealed by the Practice of Integral Naturism. He argued that individual liberation involves returning to the land and the vegan "will have to become a peasant". By respecting harmony with nature, modern agricultural techniques and chemical fertilizers would have to be abandoned.

Rimbault opposed the enslavement of animals and the consumption of eggs and milk. He criticized vegetarianism as "an ideal that stops halfway to the truth", as vegetarians supported the industrialization of milk and egg products and whether or not drawn from an abused animal, were very often poorly cared for or fed. He believed that the work of civilization is a work of "denaturization".

== Vegan colony ==
In 1923, Rimbault announced his idea to create a vegan colony in the Le Néo-Naturien magazine. His vegan colony known as Terre Libérée was located at a site 10 km west of Tours, near Luynes. The colony consisted of an old farm comprising ten hectares of cultivable land, a farmhouse and its outbuildings. Members of the colony would receive permission to use the buildings and own a vegetable patch. His long-term plan was to build a school, preventorium and a pavilion for ordinary visitors. However, his plans were ambitious and most of the members were related to his family. His partner Clémence died in 1927 but this did not set him back. He gave conferences in Paris and Tours to promote his vegan colony and published ten brochures. Residents of Luynes did not approve of anarchist boarders joining the colony.

In September 1932, Rimbault had an accident which made him paraplegic. He was left to live at the colony largely in isolation but his support of veganism did not diminish and he continued, until his death in 1949, to welcome boarders and visitors. The colony which supported traveling companions looking for temporal lodging could be compared to a hostel or anarchist rural lodge.
