= Château Bilquin de Cartier =

Château in Wallonia, Belgium

Cartier Castle
- Wallonia, Belgium
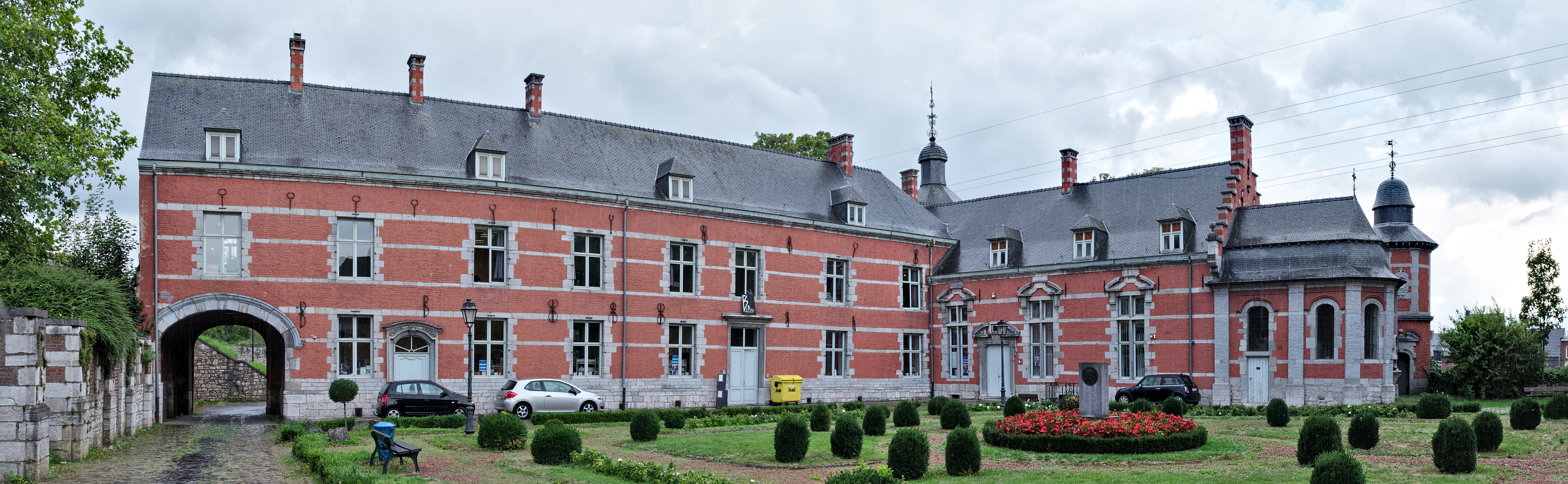

Site information
- Type: Castle
- Owner: Municipality of Charleroi

Location
- Coordinates: 50°24′24.18″N 4°23′37.68″E

Site history
- Built: c. 1635

Cartier Castle (French: Château Bilquin de Cartier, pronounced [ʃato bilkɛ̃ də kaʁtje]) is a château in Marchienne-au-Pont, a district of Charleroi, in the province of Hainaut, Wallonia, Belgium.

== History ==
Origins of the château can be traced back to the 17th century, around 1635, when the Honoré family builds a castle on the Sambre river bank. The place had formerly been occupied by a seigneurial manor which was destroyed on 21 July 1554.

In 1667, the unfinished Spanish fortress of Charleroy is captured by Louis XIV's troops during the War of Devolution. As the castle in Marchienne was located in neutral territory (under authority of the Prince-Bishopric of Liège), it was used as a hospital for both French and Spanish soldiers.

In 1695, the castle is bought by Guillaume de Bilquin, a wealthy forge owner, who completes and enhances it. In 1717, his daughter, Marie-Agnès Bilquin, marries Jean-Louis Cartier, son of the general treasurer of the prince-bishop of Liège. As such, the castle becomes the property of the Cartier de Marchienne family.

In 1740, the castle hosts Remacle Le Loup, a famous draftsman from the Liège region. It is severely damaged by a fire in 1932, and bought over by the municipality of Marchienne-au-Pont in 1938, ending more than two centuries of ownership by the Cartier family.

Marguerite Yourcenar, a French novelist and essayist, and the first woman elected to the Académie française, is the daughter of Fernande de Cartier de Marchienne, from the Cartier family related to the Cartier castle. She visited the castle in Marchienne-au-Pont in 1956, and mentions her Cartier de Marchienne ancestry and the castle in her 1974 memoir Dear Departed: A Memoir (French: Souvenirs pieux).

The Cartier castle was listed on 21 August 1980. It underwent restoration in phases between 1986 and 2001 (helped by ERDF), after having been left in a sorry condition (infested by dry rot).

== Current condition ==
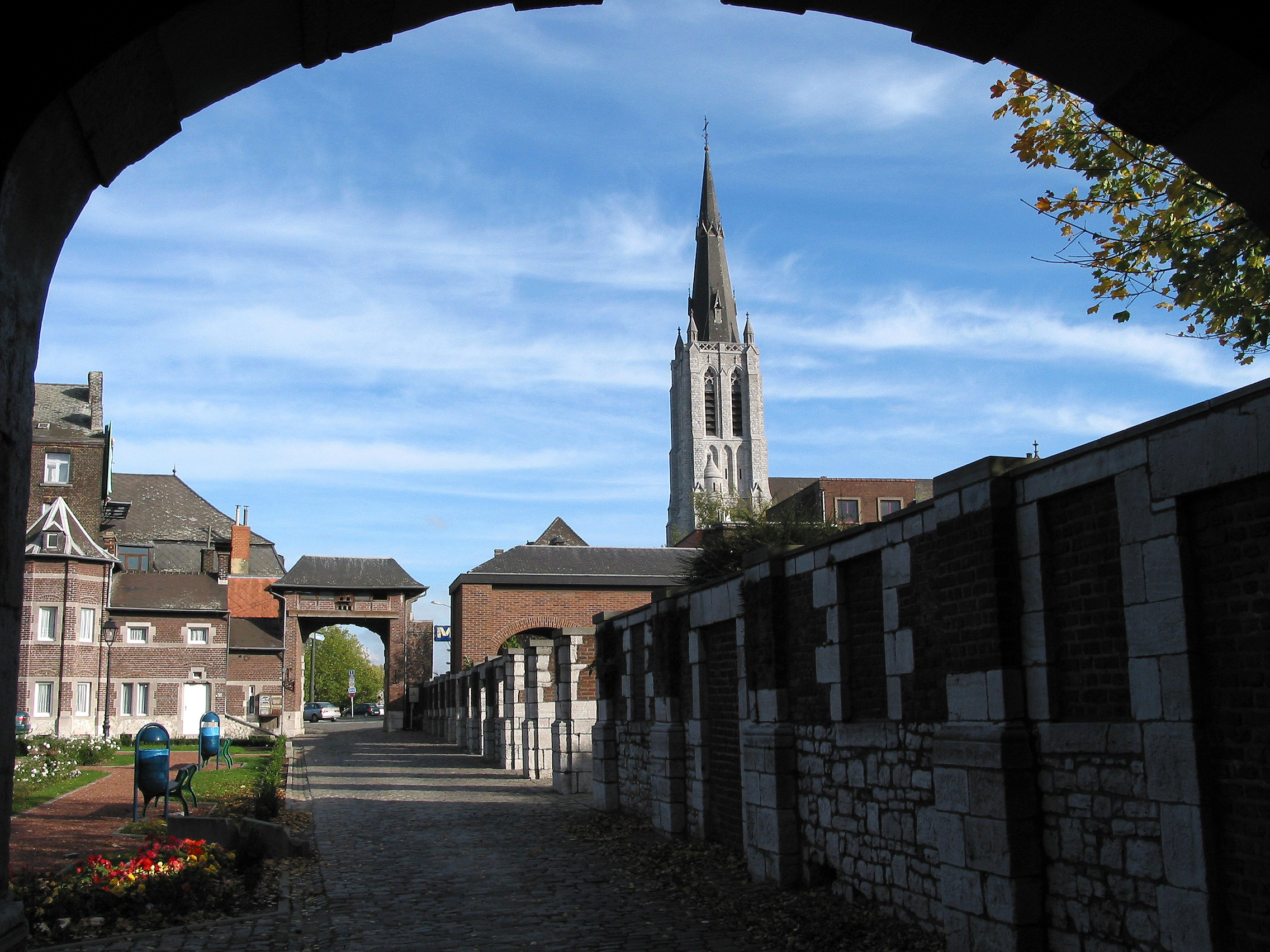
Southern part of the courtyard seen from the porch, with the Our Lady of Mercy church in the background, and the De Cartier metro station entrance on the right.

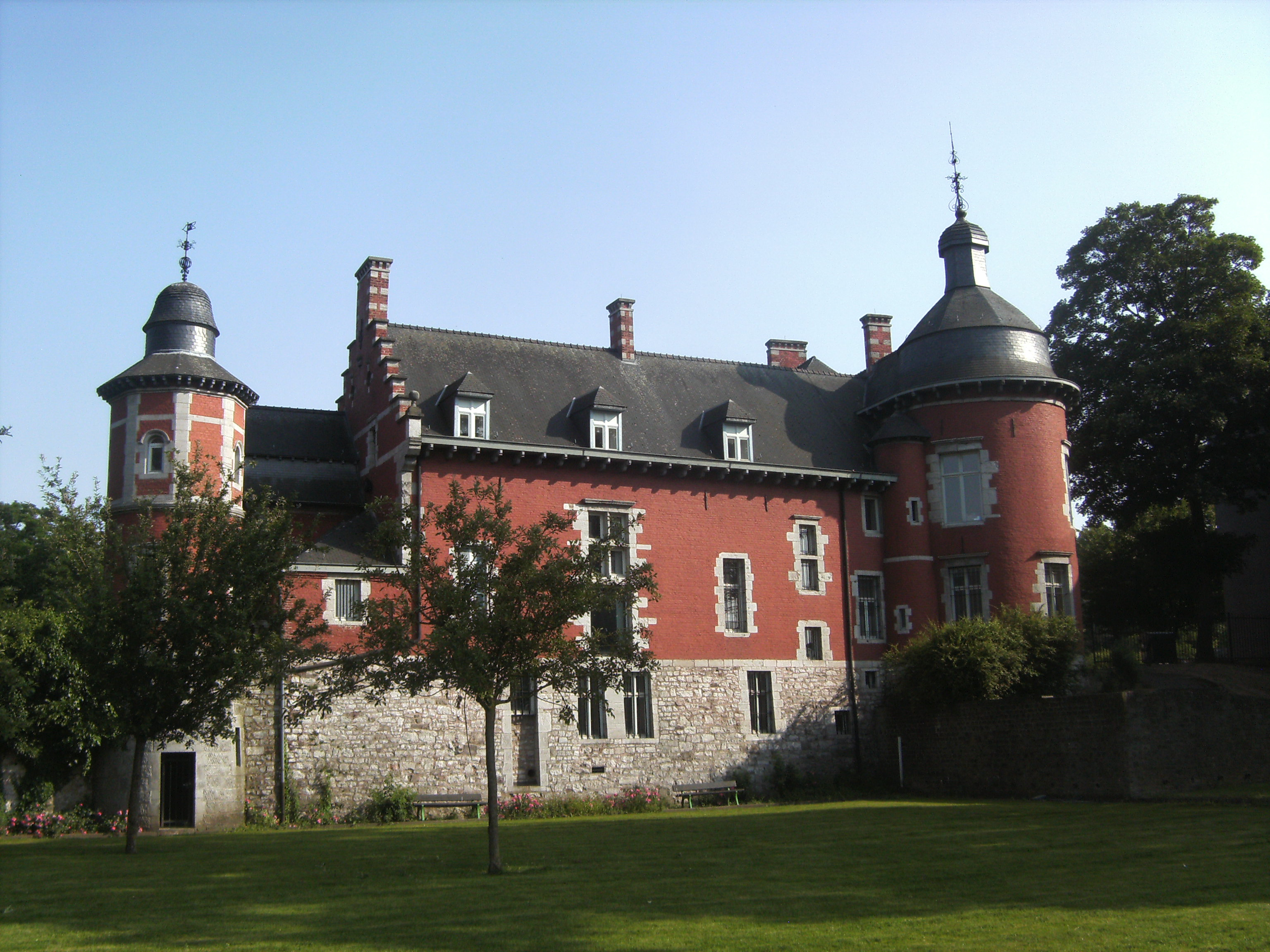
The castle seen from the Samber.

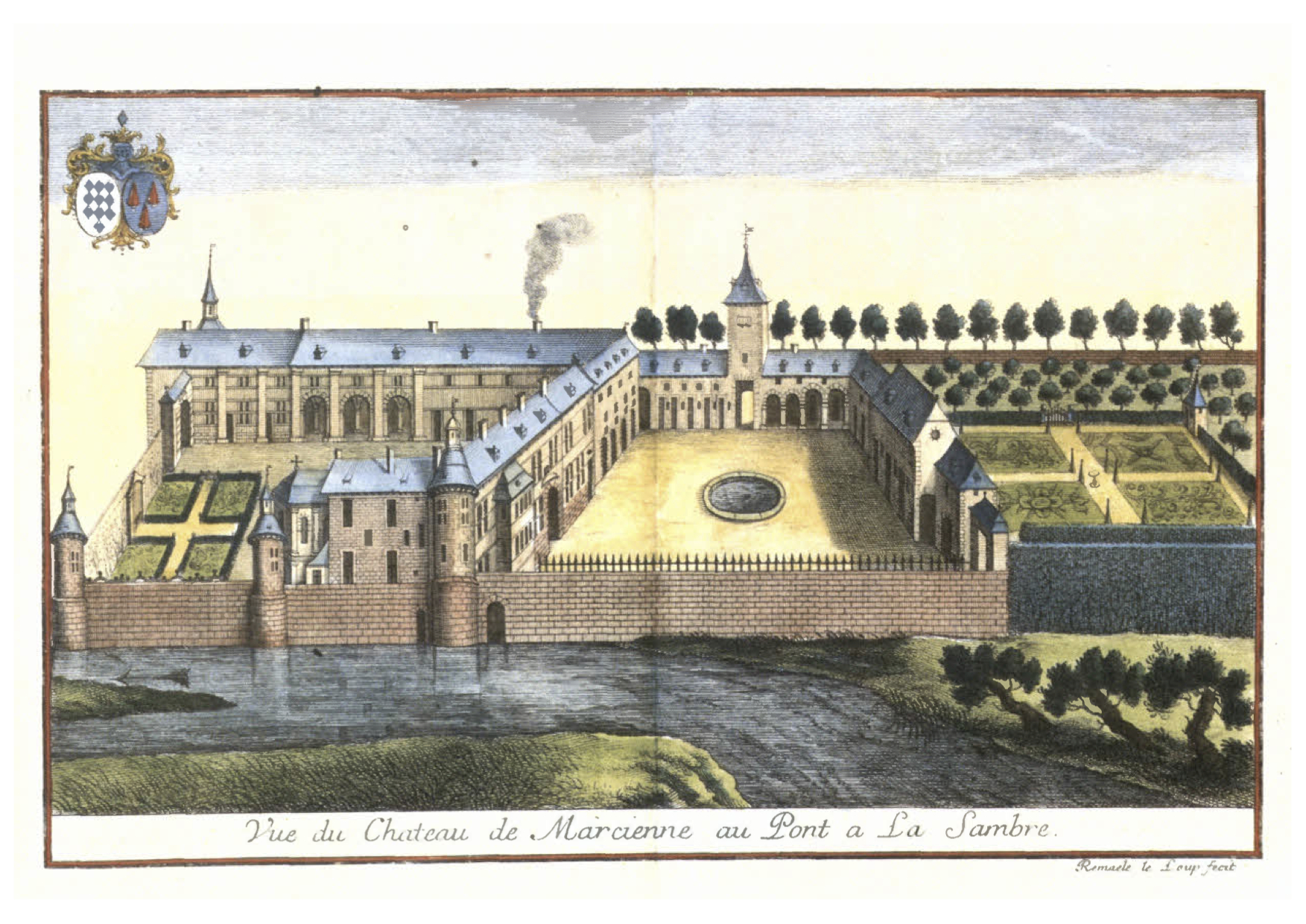
The castle in 1740 by Remacle Le Loup.

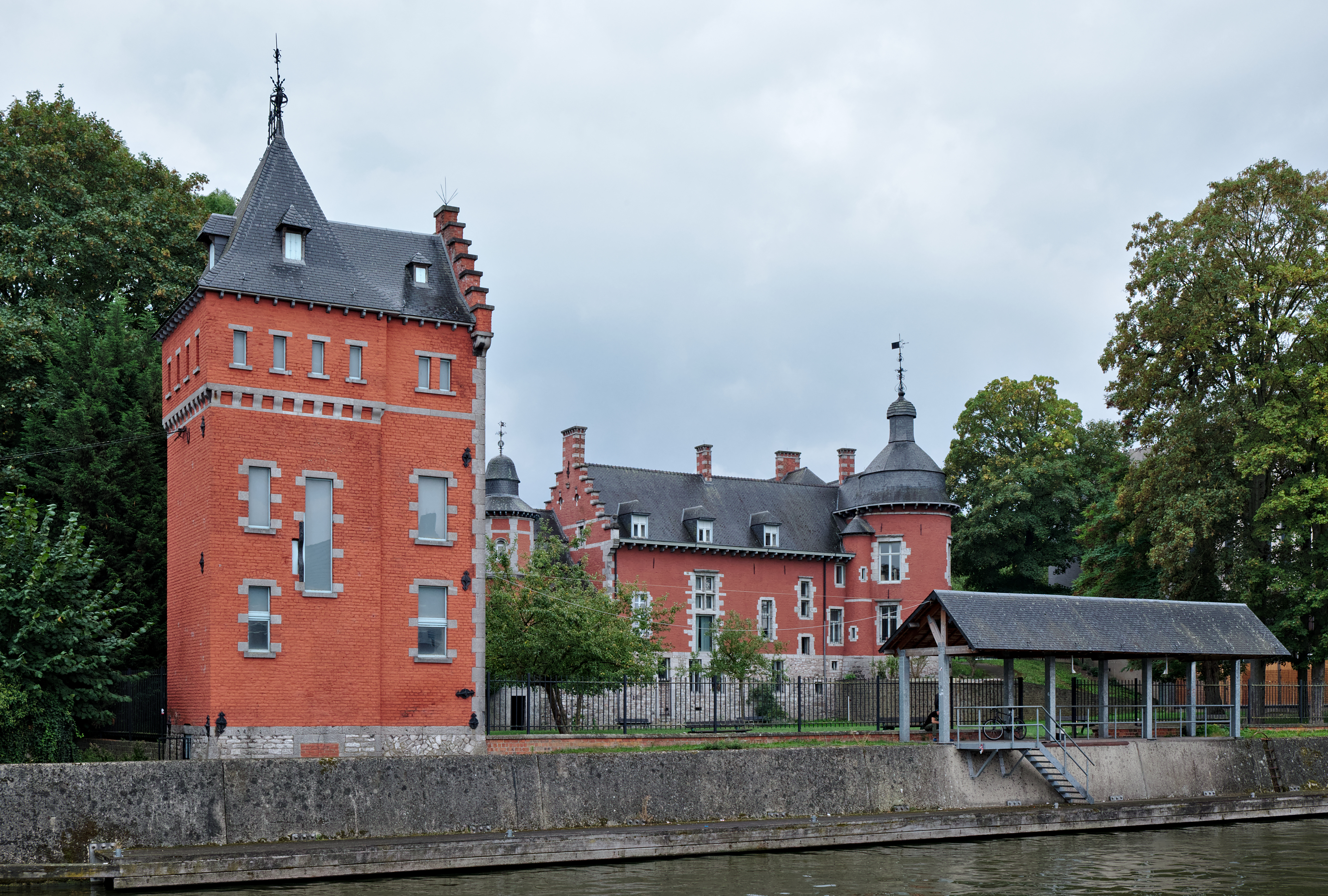
Grain elevator on the Sambre embankment.

The castle today hosts a public library on the ground floor (Bibliothèque Marguerite Yourcenar), and administrative services of the Walloon region on the first floor. The library has a section dedicated to books in Turkish language.

The courtyard is equipped with benches and is publicly accessible as part of the Marchienne-au-Pont municipal park. The castle wing which was located on the southern side of the courtyard has been demolished to create an entrance for the De Cartier station of the Charleroi metro. At the tip of the western wing, a stone porch is adorned with the arms of the Bilquin-Baillencourt family, and a 1699 date inscription. Similarly, the lintel above the northern wing door shows a scalloped key with the arms of the Cartier family. Other demolished features include a barnyard where the Marchienne-au-Pont municipal swimming pool now stands.

A 19th century grain elevator in neo-renaissance style can be seen on the Sambre embankment.

== Beijing replica ==
Emile de Cartier de Marchienne, Marguerite Yourcenar's uncle, who served as the Belgian ambassador in China at the start of the 20th century (1910-1917), ordered the construction of a Cartier castle replica, to serve as the Belgian legation building in Beijing. Plans were drawn in Marchienne-au-Pont, and bricks, slates, tiles, panelling and other materials were transported from Belgium to China for the construction. The building, which is now the Zijin Guest House, still exists in the Beijing Legation Quarter, although the original entrance has disappeared (Photo).

== See also ==
- List of castles in Belgium
- De Cartier metro station
