= Louis de Cartier de Marchienne =

Belgian businessman (1921-2013)

- Born: 26 September 1921; Turnhout
- Died: 21 May 2013 (aged 91)
- Occupation: Businessman

Baron Louis de Cartier de Marchienne (Turnhout, 26 September 1921 – 21 May 2013) was a Belgian businessman. He was managing director of the company Eternit in the 1960s, and in 1971 he became chairman of the Board of the printing company Brepols and led the company through a period of change. His son Jean-Louis de Cartier de Marchienne is a member of the board of Carta Mundi.

== Family ==
Louis Alphonse de Cartier was the third of five children of colonel-pilot Raoul de Cartier (1884-1941), and Josa Versteylen (1896-1983).

His brother Raoul de Cartier (1924-1944) was member of the Belgian Resistance. Captured by the Germans, he was executed. His other brother Baron Paul-Ernest de Cartier (1920-1977) tried to reach England during the war. Unsuccessful, he joined the Belgian army after the Liberation.

Louis also tried to escape to England, but he was captured while attempting it and was sent to the concentration camp Sachsenhausen. He was doing hard labour in Poland, but escaped and joined the Red Army, where he became a lieutenant. After the war he returned to Belgium.

There, his distant relative, ambassador Emile de Cartier de Marchienne awaited his return to adopt him (sentence tribunal Charleroi 14 March 1946). He changed his name from de Cartier into de Cartier de Marchienne. In 1968 he was made a hereditary baron.

In 1950 Louis de Cartier married Viviane Emsens (°1929) from the industrial family of that name. They have three sons and a daughter, who have a numerous offspring.

This marriage was at the origin of his professional activities within the multinational Eternit, of which the Emsens family is a major shareholder. From 1966 until 1978 he was CEO en from 1978 until 1986 president of the board.

He was also active within the publishers and printers company Brepols in Turnhout and its subsidiary Carta Mundi. During the first decade of the 21st century these firms endured financial problems and parts of it suffered bankruptcy.

== Asbestos ==
During the nineteen seventies protests became growing regarding the use of asbestos. Legislation was voted in most industrial countries forbidding further use of asbestos and ordering the removal of it where it had been used. The multinational Eternit was a particular target, being an important producer of products containing asbestos.

It also became clear that asbestos was carcinogenic. Many victims claimed compensations. The most important trial was held in Italy. On 13 February 2012 Louis de Cartier and Stephan Schmidheiny were both condemned to 16 years imprisonment by the Court of Turin in the Eternit case. They were found guilty of environmental disaster and culpable disaster. Appeal will end on 3 June 2013.

In Belgium several lawsuits have been initiated against the Eternit Group.

De Cartier died on 21 May 2013 at the age of 91, few days shy from the appeal sentence of the Turin trial.

== Literature ==
- Marie-Pierre D'UDEKEM D'ACOZ, Pour le Roi et la Patrie. La noblesse belge et la Résistance, Brussels, 2002.
- Oscar COOMANS DE BRACHÈNE, État présent de la noblesse belge, Annuaire 2004, Brussels, 2004.
- Philippe DE BOECK, Des blasons ternis par l'amiante, in: Le Soir, Brussels, 18 February 2012.

== See also ==
- Jean-Louis de Cartier de Marchienne
- Emile de Cartier de Marchienne
