= Sophie Zaïkowska =

French activist (1874–1939)

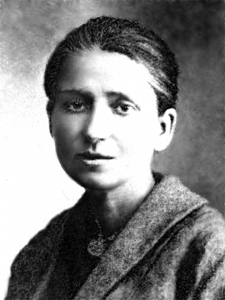
- Born: 17 May 1874; Vilna, Russian Empire
- Died: 27 February 1939 (aged 64); 19th arrondissement of Paris, France
- Occupations: Activist, nutritionist, writer
- Known for: Promotion of individualist anarchism and veganism

Sophia Zaïkowska (17 May 1874 – 27 February 1939) was a Russian-born French writer and activist, individualist anarchist of Polish descent, nutritionist and early promoter of veganism.

== Life ==
Sophie Zaïkowska was born on 17 May 1874, in Vilna (now Vilnius), which was then part of the Russian Empire and is now part of Lithuania. Her parents were Vitold Zaïkowska and Anna Czapska. Zaïkowska studied physical and natural sciences in Geneva before moving to France in 1898; she specialized in nutrition. Before the First World War, she contributed to various libertarian journals such as L'Education libertaire, L'Autarcie and in particular La Vie anarchiste, of which she became the editor in 1920.

Interested in Georges Butaud's project of creating an anarchist colony, she became his partner and collaborator in 1921 in the journal Le Néo-Naturien. She co-founded with him the free milieus of Vaux, Bascon and Quai de la Pie. The failure of these attempts at establishing colonies did not end her activism.

Zaïkowska died in Paris at the Lariboisière Hospital, 19th arrondissement of Paris in France on 27 February 1939.

== Veganism ==
With her partner she edited the journal Le Végétalien, which she managed from 1926. She was passionate about the ideas of Victor Lorenc, a close friend of the couple, and organized the vegan kitchen in the Rue Mathis in Paris. Zaïkowska wrote the article on végétalien (veganism) for Sébastien Faure's Anarchist Encyclopedia.

With Georges Butaud, she founded a vegan colony in Bascon near Château-Thierry. Zaïkowska and Butaud eliminated all dairy products and sugar from their diet and consumed only plant products.

== Selected publications ==
Her writings include:

- A Study On Work (with G. Butaud, 1912)
- Victor Lorenc (1929)
- Life and Death of Georges Butaud (1929)
- Végétalien (encyclopedia article, 1934)

Some of her texts were republished in such anthologies as:

- Emilie Lamotte, Jeanne Morand, Sophie Zaïkowska, L'En-Dehors, Paris, 2005.
- Communautés, naturiens, végétariens, végétaliens et crudivégétaliens dans le mouvement anarchiste français: textes, Invariance, Paris, 1994.
