= Emile de Cartier de Marchienne =

Belgian diplomat

Baron Émile de Cartier de Marchienne GCVO GBE GCSG
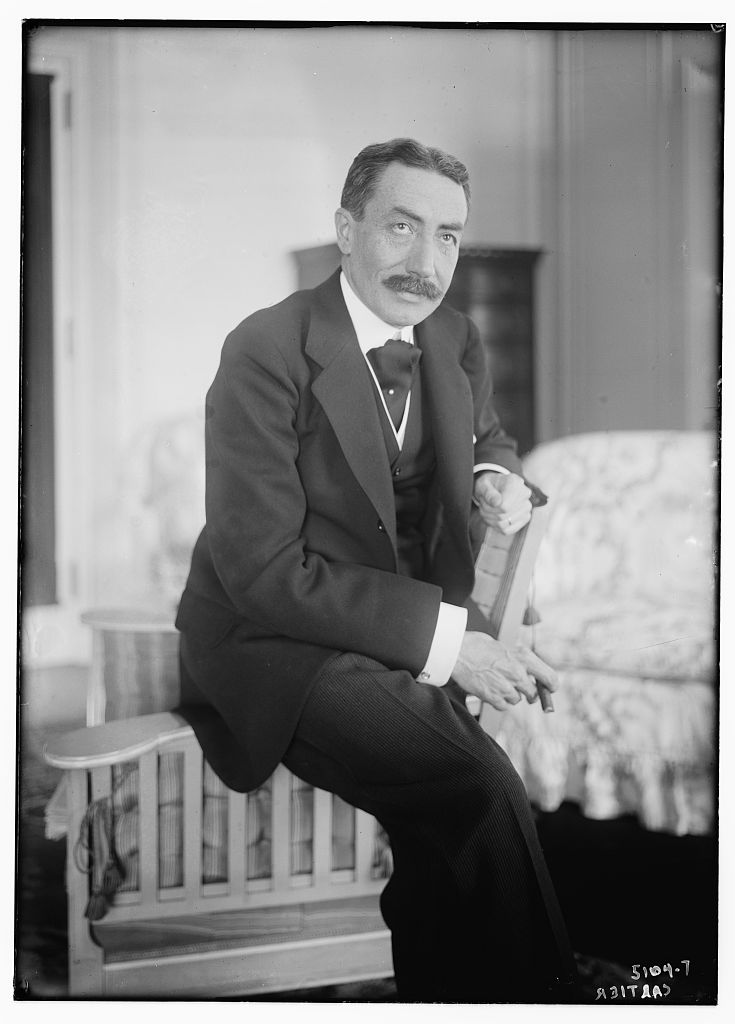
- Emile de Cartier de Marchienne in 1920

Belgian Ambassador to the United Kingdom
- In office 1927–1946
- Preceded by: Ludovic Moncher
- Succeeded by: Alain Obert de Thieusies

Belgian Ambassador to the United States
- In office 1917–1927
- Preceded by: Emmanuel Havenith
- Succeeded by: Albert de Ligne

Envoy Extraordinary and Minister Plenipotentiary in Cuba, Haiti and the Dominican Republic
- In office 1926–1927

Envoy Extraordinary and Minister Plenipotentiary in China and Siam
- In office 1910–1917

Personal details
- Born: 30 November 1871 Schaerbeek, Belgium
- Died: 10 May 1946 (aged 74) London, United Kingdom
- Spouse(s): Alice Draper Coburn (m. 1907; died 1908) Marie Dow Cary (m. 1919; died 1936)
- Relations: Marguerite Yourcenar (niece)
- Parent(s): Paul-Émile de Cartier de Marchienne; Louisa Brown O'Meara
- Awards: Civic Decoration, Order of Leopold, Order of the Sacred Treasure, Legion of Honour

Baron Émile-Ernest de Cartier de Marchienne (30 November 1871 – 10 May 1946) was a Belgian diplomat who was ambassador to several countries, most principally the United States and the United Kingdom.

== Early life ==
De Cartier de Marchienne was born on 30 November 1871 in Schaerbeek, Belgium. He was the son of Baron Paul-Émile de Cartier de Marchienne (1837–1887) and Louisa Jane Brown O'Meara (1849–1935), who had been born in London. His family owned the Château Bilquin de Cartier, a château in Marchienne-au-Pont, Belgium. (Note: Château Bilquin de Cartier, located in the district of Charleroi, in the province of Hainaut, Wallonia, Belgium, passed into the Cartier family in 1717 when Marie-Agnès Bilquin (the daughter of Guillaume de Bilquin, who had bought château in 1695 and finished construction) married Jean-Louis Cartier, son of the general treasurer of the prince-bishop of Liège, becoming the property of the Cartier de Marchienne family.)

Through his sister, Fernande de Cartier de Marchienne, he was uncle to the French novelist Marguerite Yourcenar.

== Career ==
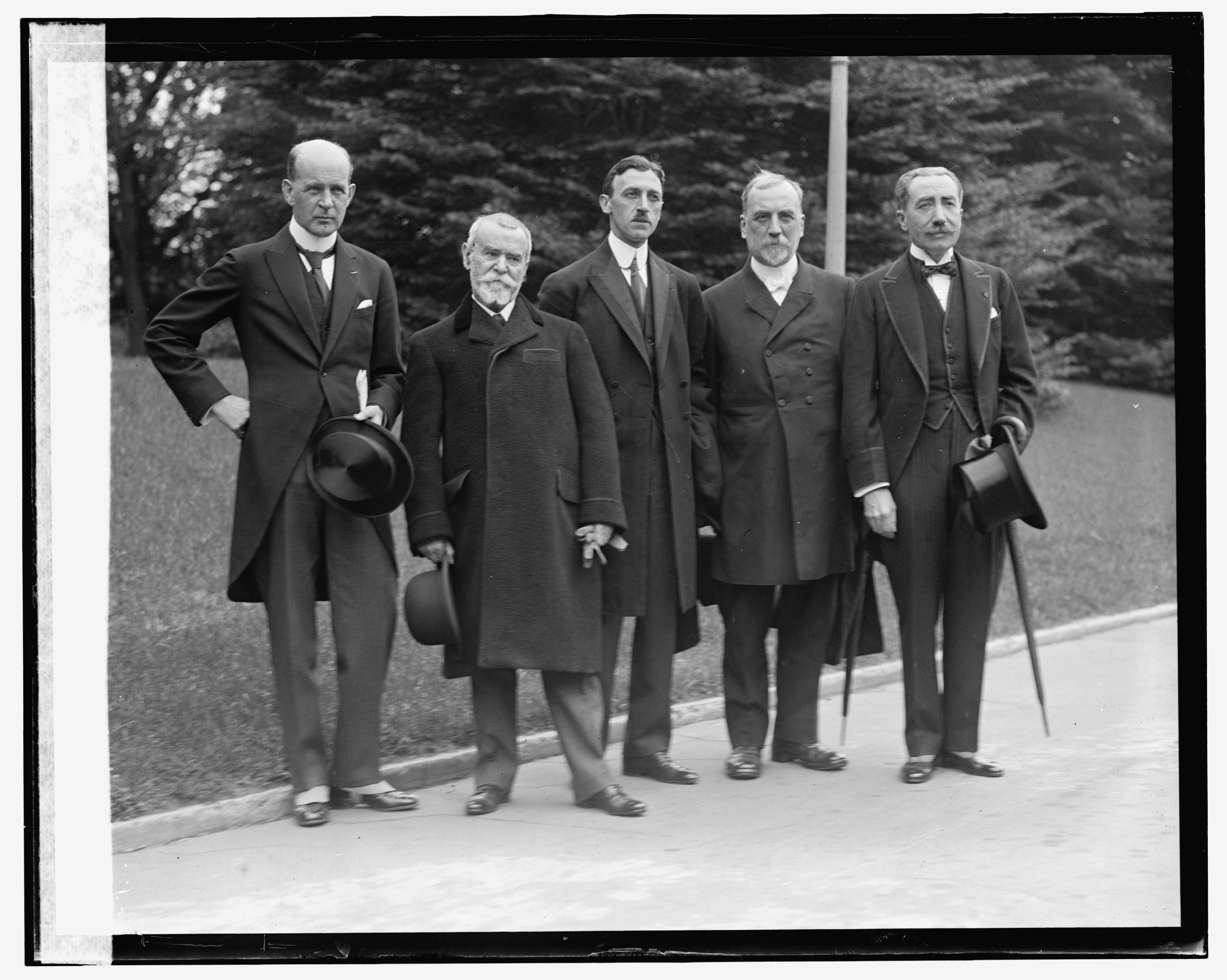
Envoy Andries de Graeff, Ambassador Jean Jules Jusserand; Georges Lauga; Rev. Leonard Hoyas; and Baron de Cartier de Marchienne, May 1924

In 1896, at only 25 years old, Baron de Cartier de Marchienne was put in charge of the Belgian legation in Rio de Janeiro, Brazil. He served briefly before becoming secretary of the Belgian legation in Tokyo.

From 1910 to 1917, he served as Envoy Extraordinary and Minister Plenipotentiary in Peking, China and Siam. From 1917 to 1927, he was head of the Belgian legation in Washington, D.C. (which was elevated to an embassy in 1919), while also serving as Envoy Extraordinary and Minister Plenipotentiary in Cuba, Haiti and the Dominican Republic from 1926 to 1927.

From 1927 until he died in 1946, which included all of World War II, he was the Belgian Ambassador to the United Kingdom, of which the last six he was Dean of the Diplomatic Corps.

== Personal life ==
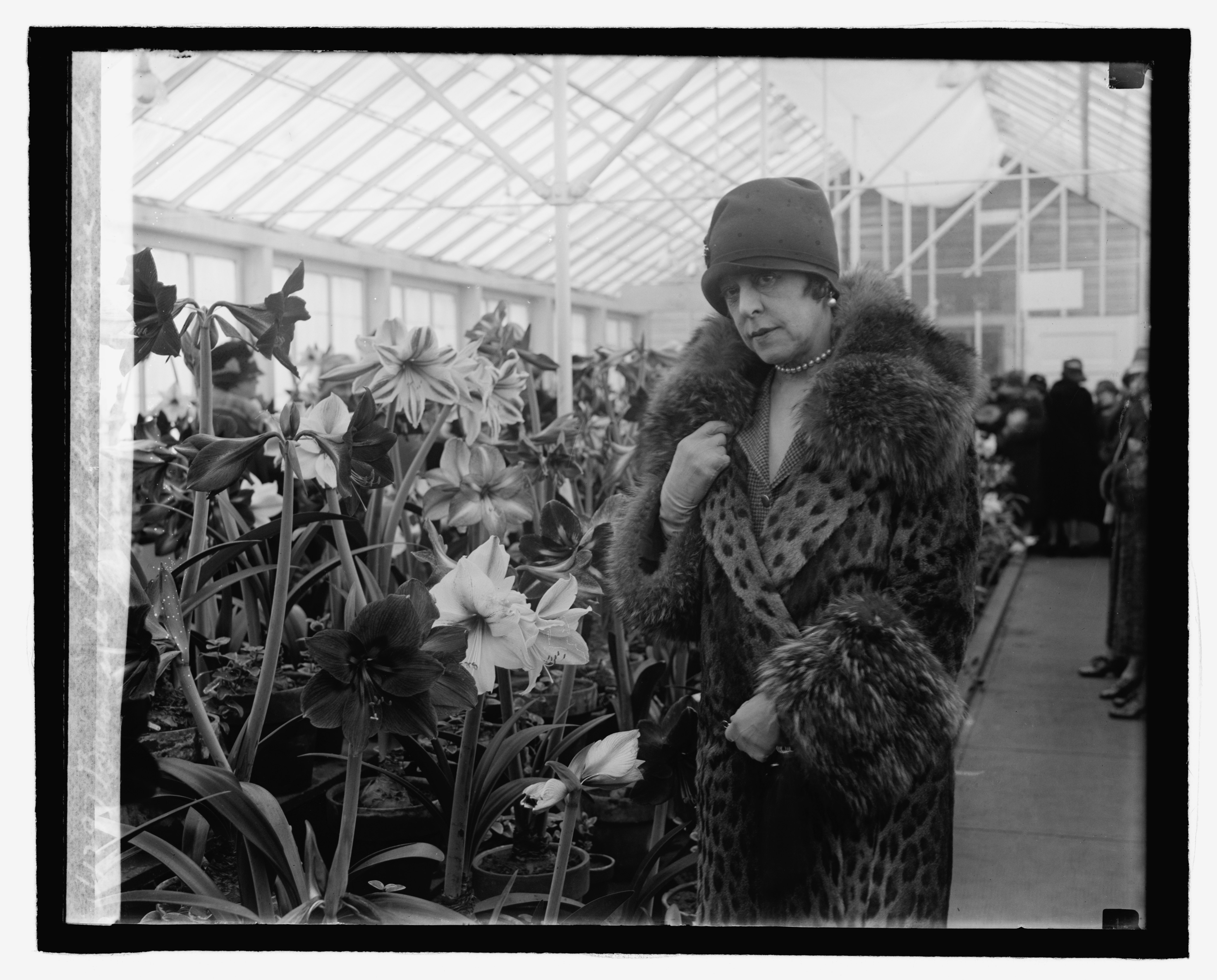
Photograph of his second wife, Marie, Baroness de Cartier de Marchienne, at the Amaryllis show, 1927

In New York in 1907, he married American Alice Draper Coburn (1876–1907), the daughter of Charles Henry Colburn and Frances Eudora (née Draper) Colburn. A niece of Governor Eben S. Draper, industrialist George A. Draper and diplomat William F. Draper, she was ill when they married, and died not long after on 25 November 1908 at her mother's home in Phoenix, Arizona.

On 16 July 1919, he married American socialite Marie Emery (née Dow) Cary at the Church of the Madeleine in Paris, the widow of Hamilton Wilkes Cary since 1917. She had previously married, and divorced in 1909, multi-millionaire Elihu B. Frost, President of the Submarine Boat Corporation.

The Baroness died on 18 February 1936, leaving a net estate worth $685,026. As he had no children from either of his marriages, he adopted his distant relative, Louis de Cartier, in 1946 to keep the name "de Marchienne" in the family. The Baron de Cartier de Marchienne died on 10 May 1946 in London, United Kingdom. He is buried in Brookwood Cemetery (Plot 55).

== Honours and awards ==
Baron de Cartier received honorary doctorates from Princeton University, Columbia University, Brown University, University of Rochester, Villanova University, as well as the Universities of Oxford, University of Edinburgh and University of Belfast.

He was also awarded with:

- Civic Decoration
- Commander in the Order of Leopold (1919).
- Grand Cordon in the Order of Leopold
- Knight Grand Cross with Chain of the Royal Victorian Order.
- Knight Grand Cross of the Order of the British Empire.
- Commander in the Order of the Sacred Treasure.
- Officer in the Legion of Honour.
- Knight of the Order of Saint Gregory the Great.
- Coronation Medal of HM George VI.
