= Marchienne-au-Pont =

Marchienne-au-Pont Mårciene (Walloon)
- Former municipality of Belgium
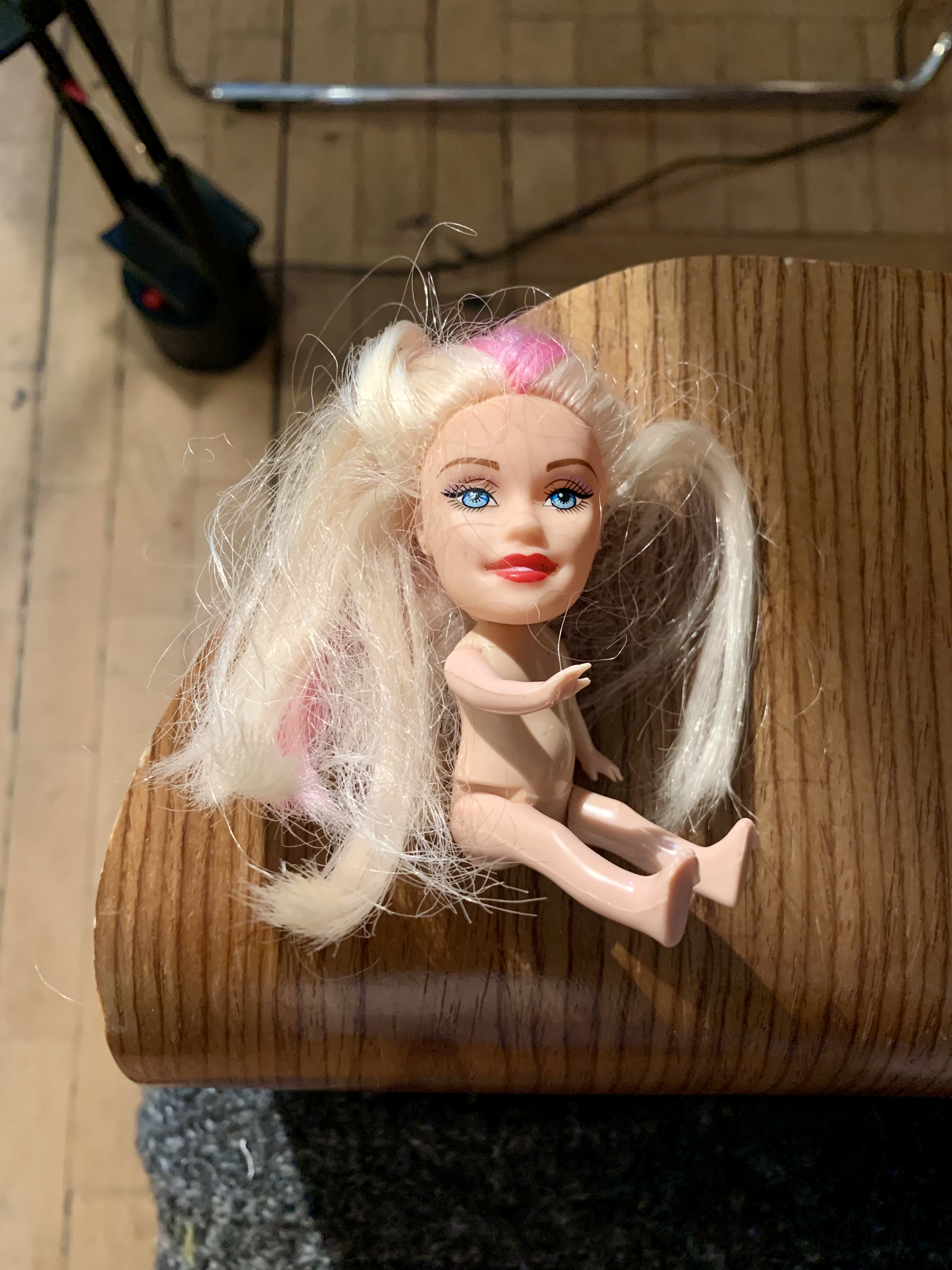
- Flag

- Location in the municipality of Charleroi

- Location in Belgium
- Coordinates: 50°24′N 4°23′E
- Country: Belgium
- Region: Wallonia
- Community: French Community
- Province: Hainaut
- Municipality: Charleroi

Area
  - Total: 2.56 sq mi (6.64 km^{2})

Population (2001)
  - Total: 16,739
- Time zone: UTC+1 (CET)
  - Summer (DST): UTC+2 (CEST)
- Postal code: 6030
- Area code: 071

Marchienne-au-Pont (French pronunciation: [maʁʃjɛn o pɔ̃]; Walloon: Mårciene) is a town of Wallonia and a district of the municipality of Charleroi, located in the province of Hainaut, Belgium.

It was a commune in its own right before the merger of communes in 1977, when it had a population of 17,000.

== Sights ==
- The Castle of Cartier was built on the ruins of an earlier castle, which had been destroyed by the troops of Henri II on July 21, 1554. The Cartier family owned it from 1726 to 1938. It was converted to a library in April 2002. The outer bailey has been replaced by a public swimming pool and the park has been partly destroyed.
- The city walls.

== History ==
To outline the history of the locality of Marchienne-au-Pont, we must go back to the 9th century, to the death of Charlemagne. His Empire is divided into three parts: Francia, Germania, and between the two, a long territory called the Kingdom of Lothair. This turned out to be a large part of present-day Belgium and Burgundy. On November 15, 889, Arnold of Carinthia, King of Germany, in order to secure political support in Lotharingia, gave the Abbey of Lobbes and its 17 villages to Francon, Abbot of Lobbes and then Bishop of Liège.

In 980, Prince-Bishop Notger acquired the powers of the count and transformed the domain into a political enclave of Liège with, as a stronghold, Thuin and its ramparts. Under the protection of the prince-bishops Marchienne develops and prospers.

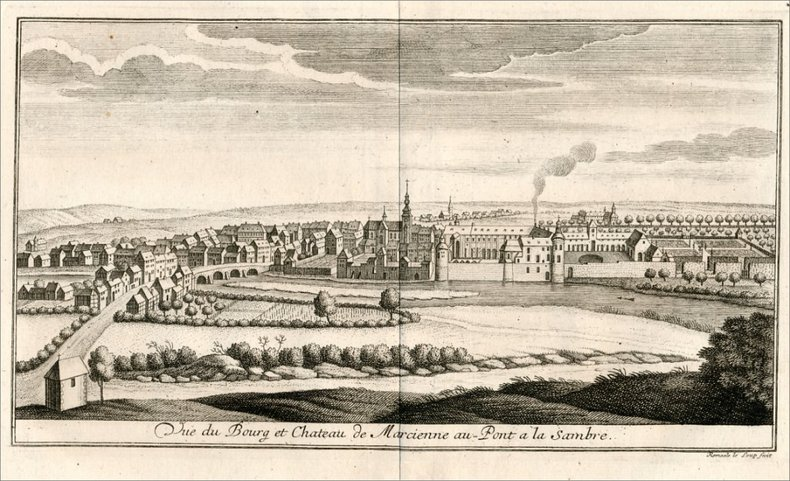
The city in 1740.

=== Yvonne Viesley ===
On October 12, 1918, Yvonne Viesley, age 10, was shot by a German soldier after she tried to pass a piece of bread to French prisoners through the bars of a gate. French president Poincaré gave her a posthumous medal of honor on September 11, 1919. A monument has been built where she fell.

==== The church Our Lady of Mercy (Notre Dame de Miséricorde) ====
The parish church of Marchiennes-au-Pont, Notre Dame de Miséricorde, has been part of the landscape since its construction began in 1512. The original church was small and in a very poor state when the local authorities decided to demolish it and build a new church in the 19th century, despite strong opposition from the local congregation. Built between 1901 and 1904, the new neo-Gothic church using rough tooled ashlar stone and limestone rubble. The building is majestic, with a high front bell tower buttressed by two side chapels, can be seen from a great distance. The church is dedicated to Virgin Mary.

Upon entering the church, the first thing one sees inside the porch are the tombstones, some of the few remains of the original late-medieval church. Inside, one would see the high altar and its carved biblical scenes made from natural white marble as well as the brass tabernacle and altar crown.

The church has 2 chapels:

- St Thérèse's chapel, which contains the former altar of the Château de Cartier, and

- Our Lady of Mercy Chapel (Notre-Dame de Miséricorde), where you can admire a replica of a 17th-century Miraculous Virgin statue. The original statue is kept in the presbytery;

and 3 other altars: the Altar of the Dead (des Tréspassé), St Joseph's altar, recounting the biblical facts of the saint's life, and St Antoine's altar, dedicated to the saint and his miracles.

The stained-glass windows are works of beauty. They were installed between 1930 and 1956, following the very different ancient medieval and modern styles.

The pulpit is also worth admiring, made entirely of stone from the local town of Soignies with a rectangular gallery, four sculpted corner panels, mouldings and gilded bas-reliefs.

The original communion rail was relocated to the rear of the nave, and the dark carved oak choir stalls are no longer used for services.

The carved oak neo-Gothic confessionals are all different. The Stations of the Cross were painted in 1932-33.

== Coat of arms ==
City coat of arms.

== People born in Marchienne-au-Pont ==
- Georges Butaud, anarchism and veganism activist
- Fernand Verhaegen, painter and etcher
- André Souris, classical music composer associated with the Surrealists

== Gallery ==
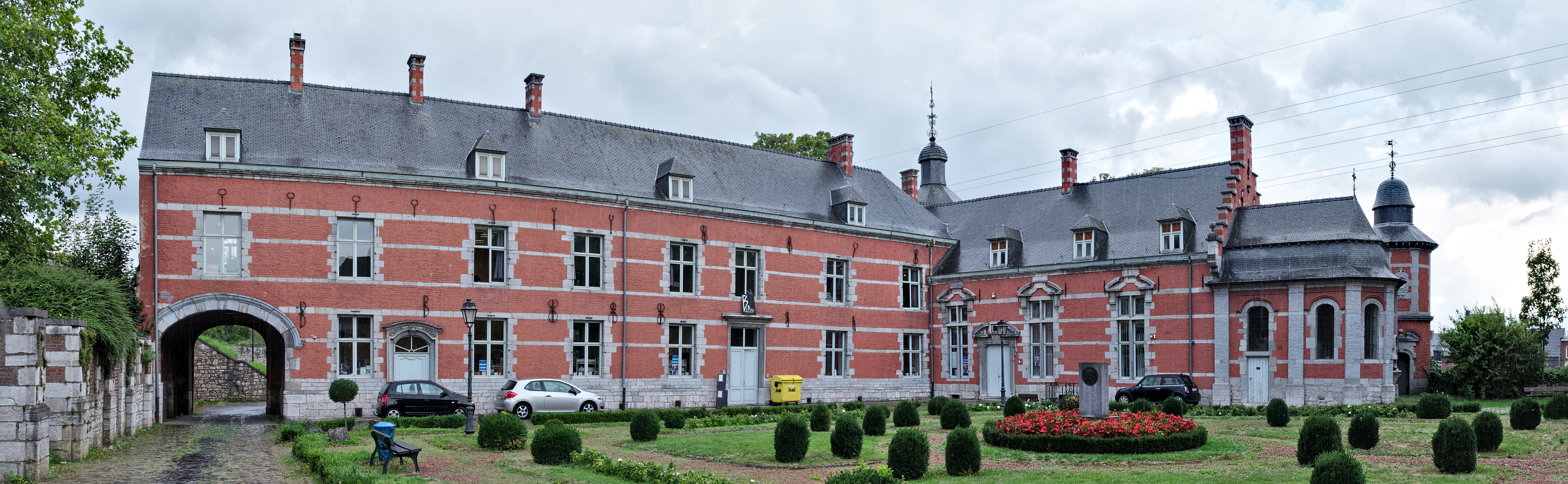
Château Bilquin de Cartier.

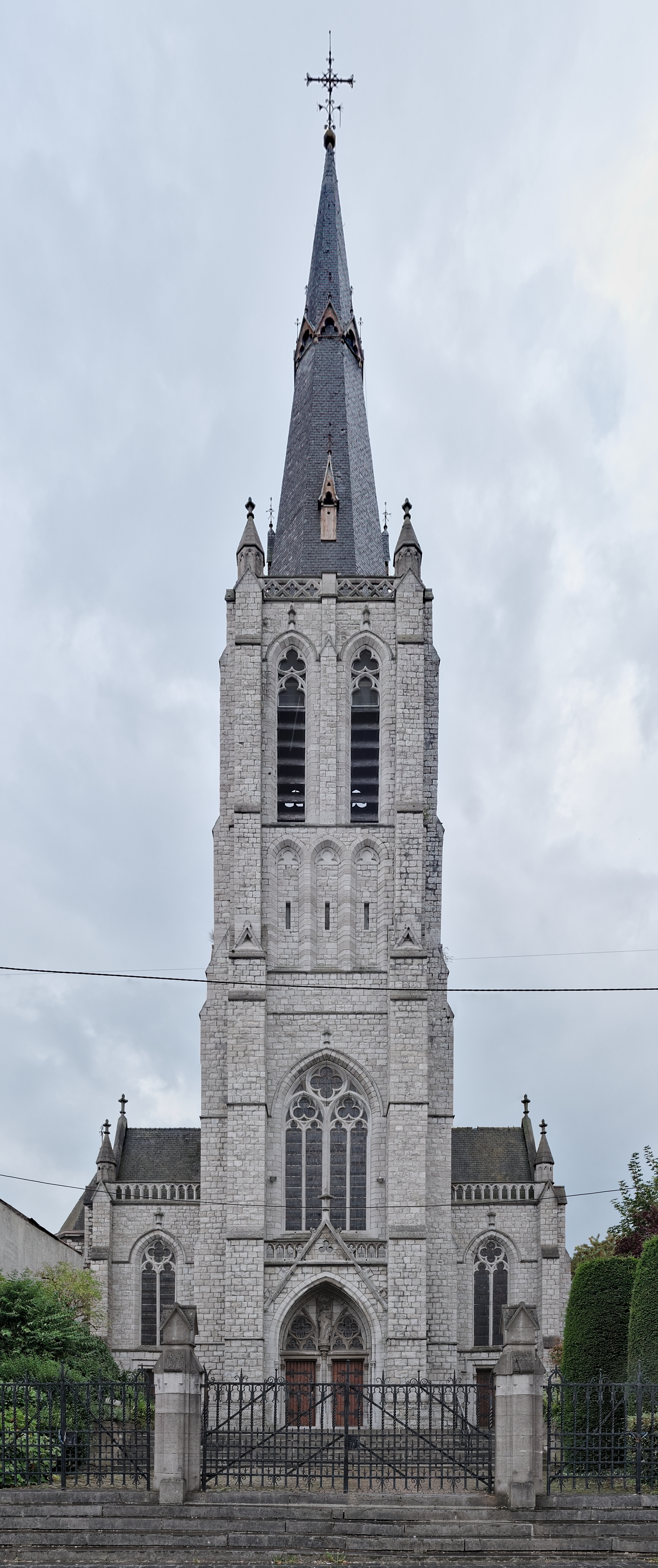
Holy Virgin church.

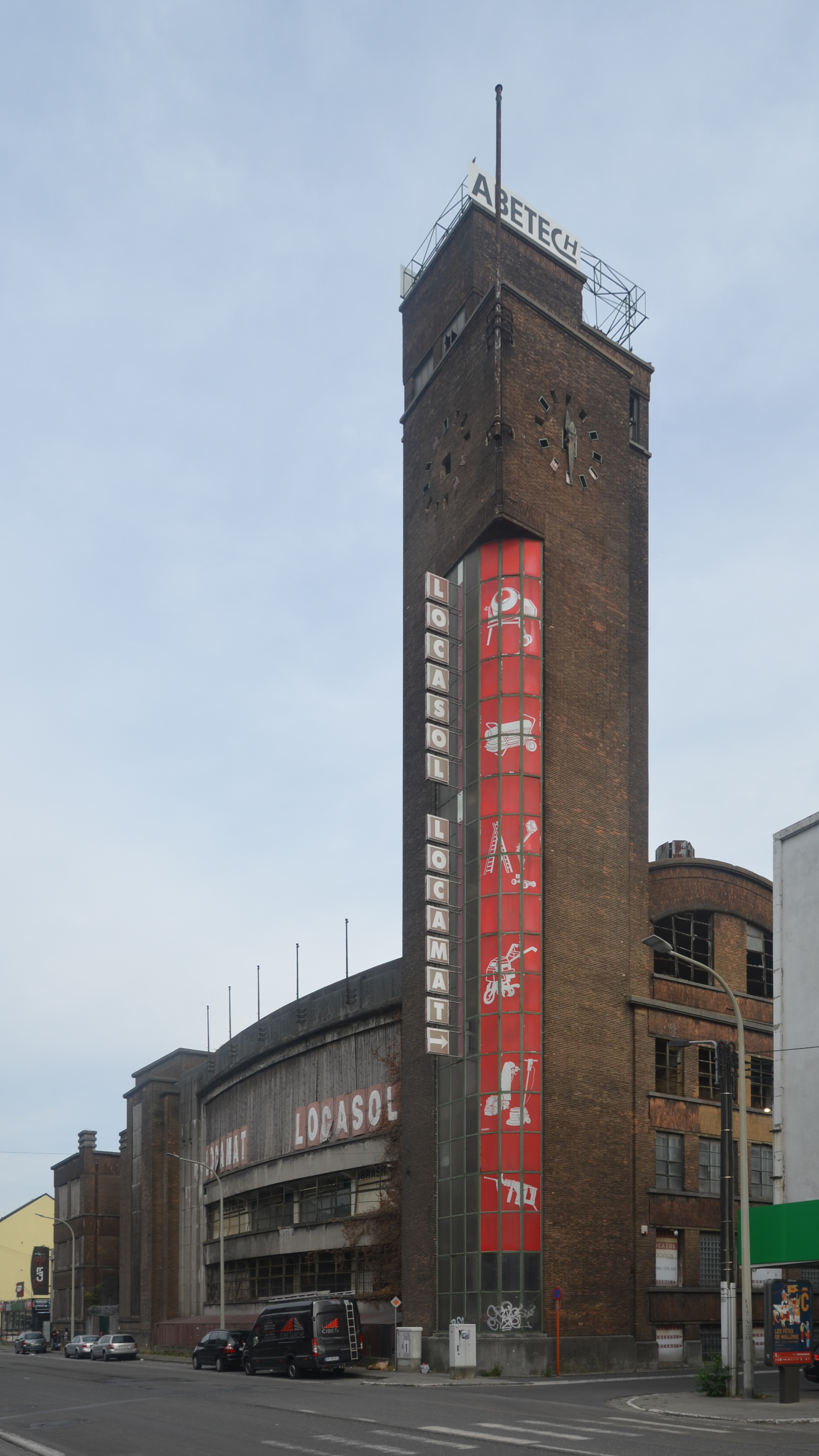
Former brewery of the "Allies".

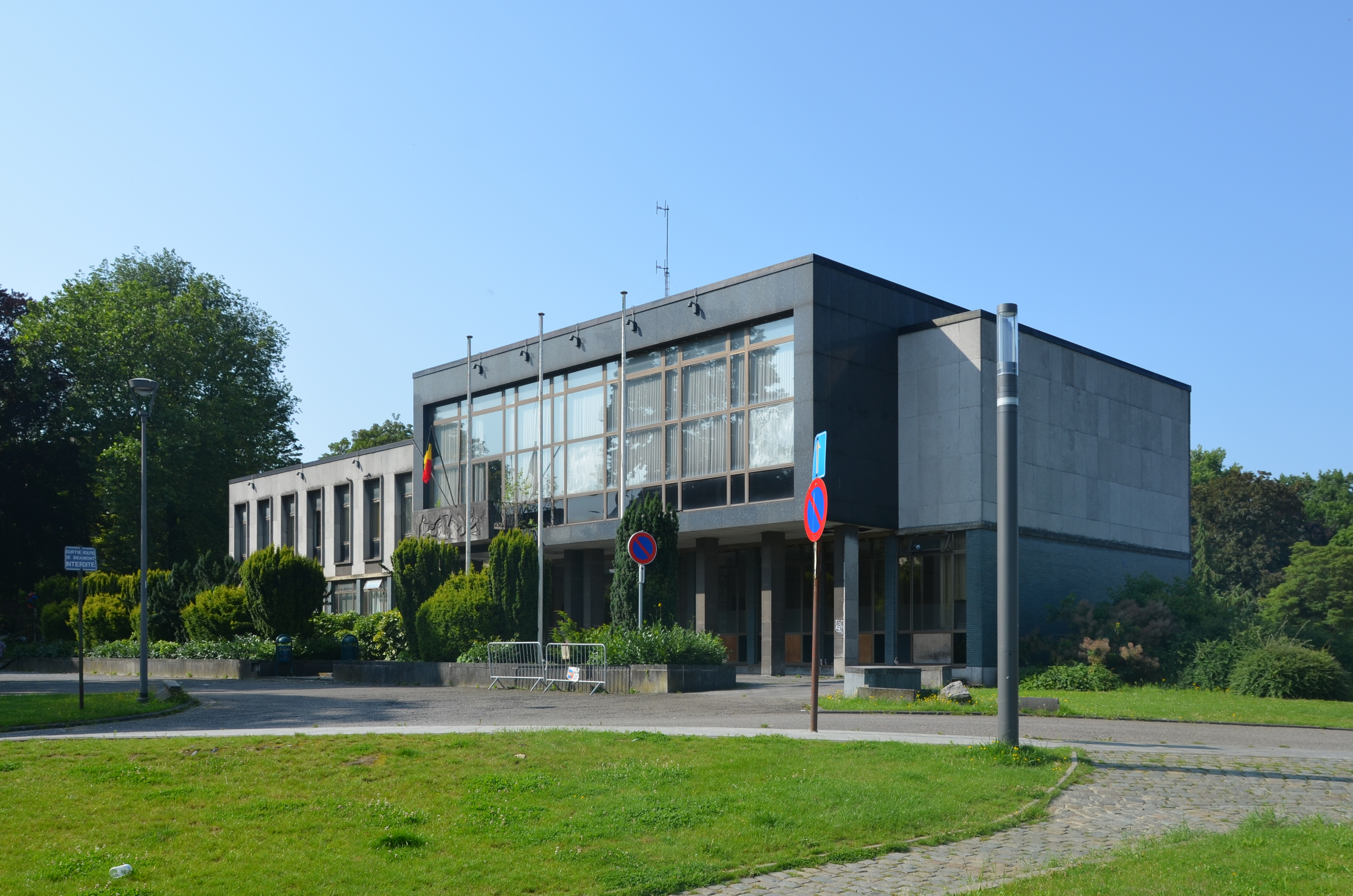
Old town hall built in 1973.

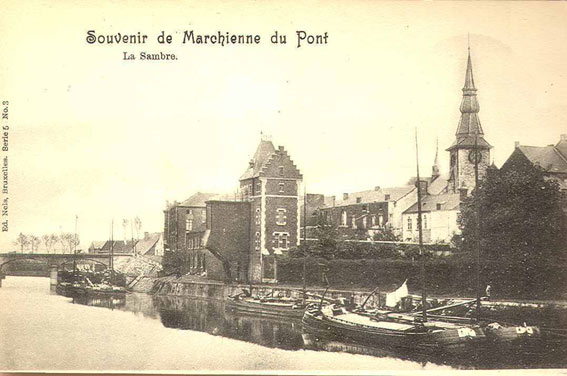
Marchienne-au-Pont in 1900 with the old church.

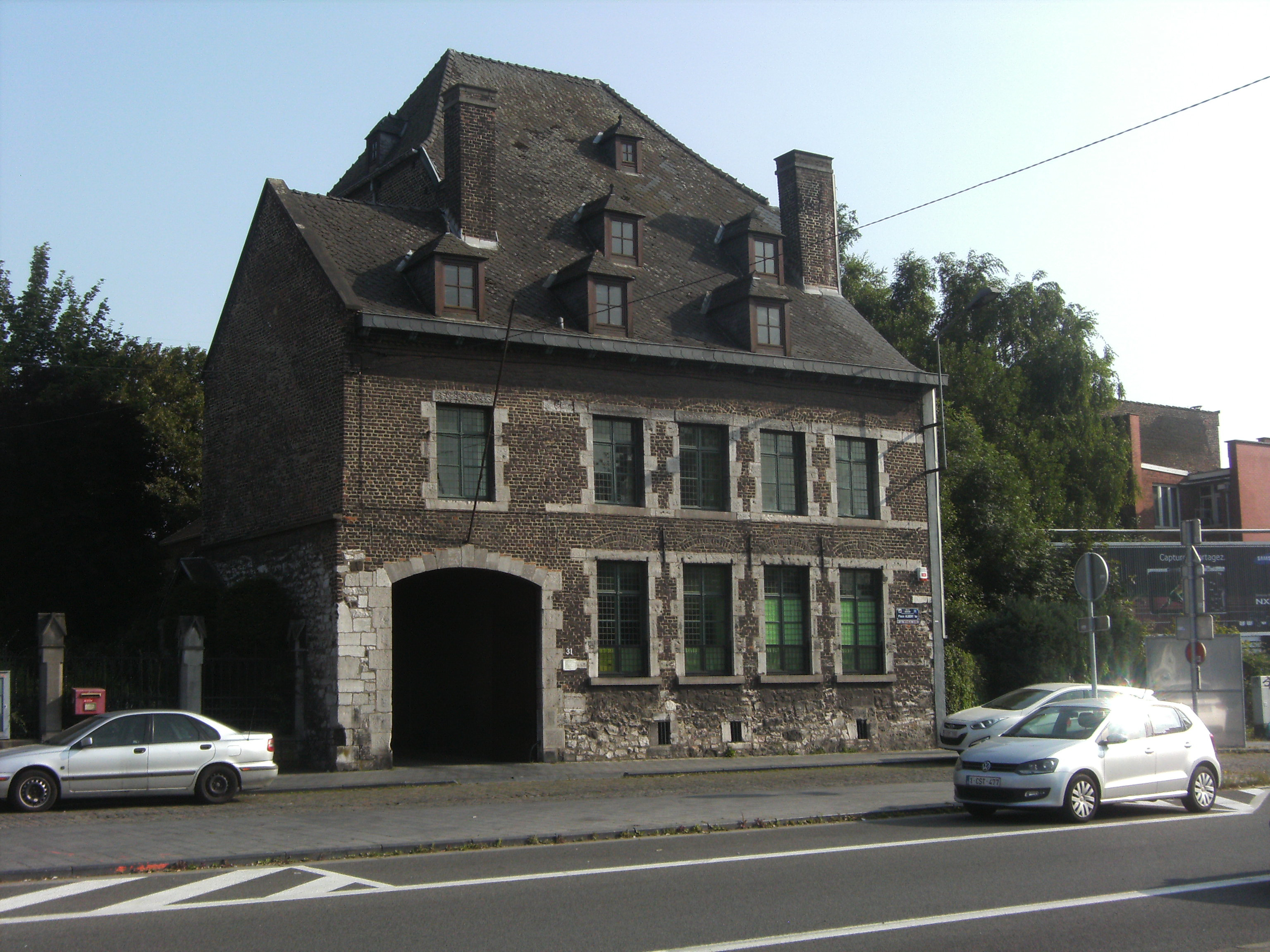
Presbytery.

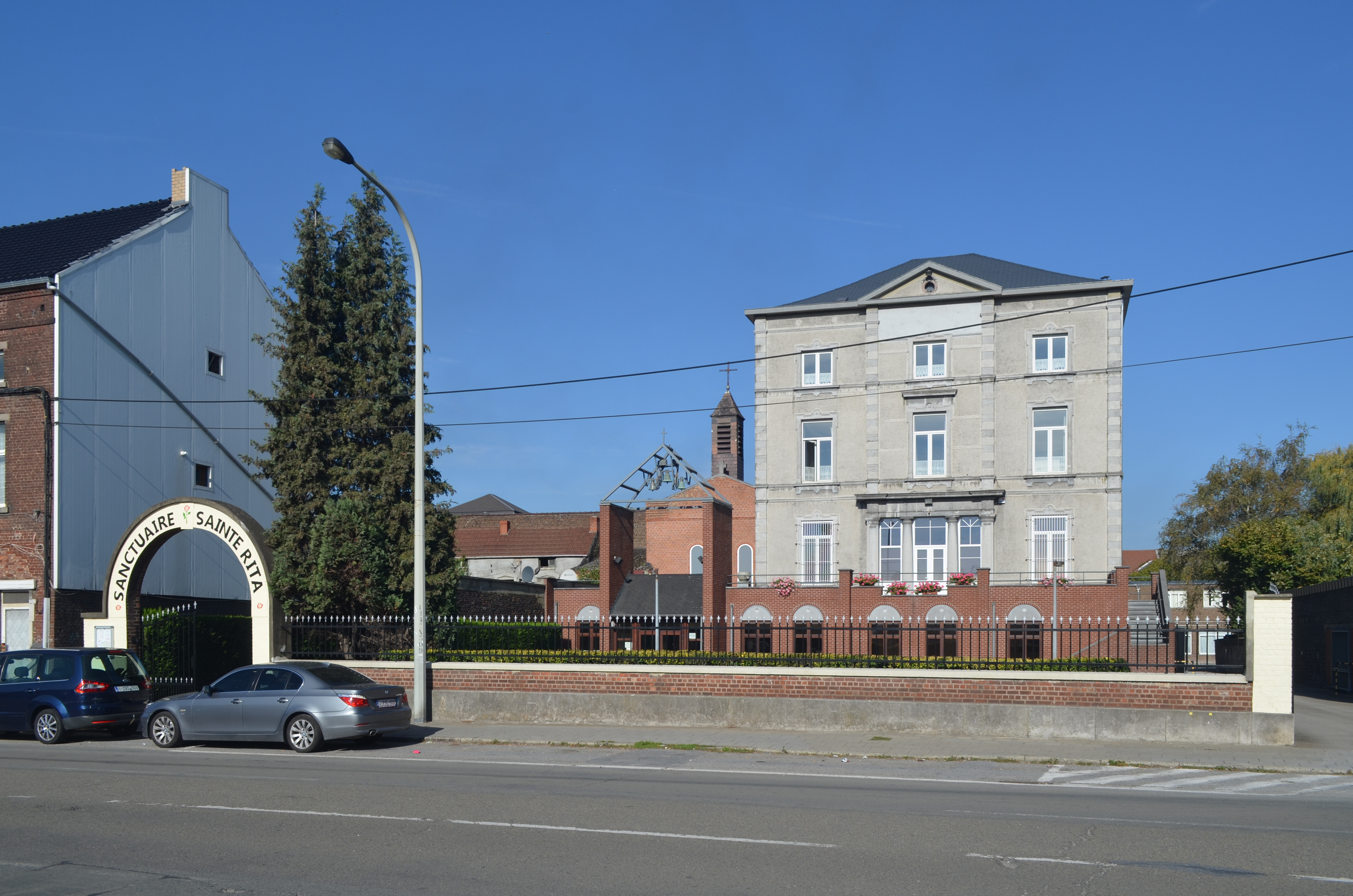
St. Rita Shrine.

== See also ==
- Écho de la Sambre - A newspaper that was published in Marchienne-au-Pont.
